= Verney baronets of Claydon House (1818) =

Verney baronets, of Claydon House
- Escutcheon of the Verney baronets of Claydon House
- Motto: Ung sent, ung soleil (One faith, one sun) (Verney); Servata fides cineri (Faith kept with my ancestor) (Calvert)
- Arms: Quarterly, 1st and 4th, azure on a cross argent fimbriated or, five mullets gules (Verney); 2nd and 3rd, paly of six erminois pean, a bend engrailed counterchanged (Calvert)
- Crest: 1st, a demi-phoenix in flames proper, charged with five mullets in cross or and looking at rays of the sun (Verney); 2nd, out of a mural coronet, argent two spears erect, therefrom two pennons flowing towards the dexter, one erminois, the other pean (Calvert)

The Calvert, later Verney baronetcy, of Claydon House in the County of Buckingham, was created in the Baronetage of the United Kingdom on 3 December 1818 for General Harry Calvert, for many years Adjutant-General of the Forces. The second Baronet assumed in 1827 the surname of Verney in lieu of Calvert. He had succeeded to the Verney estates through his cousin Richard Calvert, who married Mary (née Nicholson), the widow of the Hon. John Verney, eldest son of Ralph Verney, 1st Earl Verney. Verney sat as Liberal Member of Parliament for Buckingham and Bedford.

The 3rd Baronet was a captain in the Royal Navy and represented Buckingham in the House of Commons as a Liberal. The 4th Baronet was also a Liberal politician and served as Parliamentary Secretary to the Board of Agriculture and Fisheries from 1914 to 1915. He was succeeded by his son, the 5th Baronet, a member of the Buckinghamshire County Council who served as Vice-Lieutenant and High Sheriff of Buckinghamshire. As 2026 the title is held by his grandson, the 7th Baronet, who succeeded in 2026.

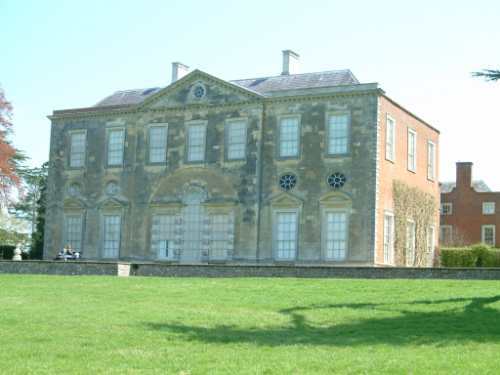
Claydon House

The family seat is Claydon House, near Aylesbury Vale, Buckinghamshire.

== Verney baronets, of Claydon House (1818) ==
- Sir Harry Calvert, 1st Baronet (died 1826)
- Sir Harry Verney, 2nd Baronet (1801–1894)
- Sir Edmund Hope Verney, 3rd Baronet (1838–1910)
- Lt.-Col. Sir Harry Calvert Williams Verney, 4th Baronet, DSO (1881–1974)
- Sir Ralph Bruce Verney, 5th Baronet, KBE (1915–2001)
- Sir Edmund Ralph Verney, 6th Baronet (1950–2026)
- Sir Nicholas Edmund Verney, 7th Baronet (born 1983)

== Extended family ==
Frederick Verney, second son of the 2nd Baronet, was successively an Anglican clergyman, barrister and diplomat who served as Liberal Member of Parliament for Buckingham from 1906 to 1910. His son Ralph was an army officer who served as Secretary to the Speaker of the House of Commons from 1921 to 1955, and was created a baronet in 1946.

George Hope Lloyd-Verney (who assumed the additional surname of Lloyd in 1888), third son of the 2nd Baronet, was a colonel in the Army. He wrote the booklet Four-Handed Chess which was published in 1881. His son Sir Harry Lloyd-Verney was Treasurer and Private Secretary to Queen Mary. His son Gerald Lloyd-Verney (1900–1957) was a major-general in the Irish Guards. His son Peter Vivian Verney (b. 1930) is an author.

The Right Reverend Stephen Edmund Verney, younger son of the 4th Baronet, was Bishop of Repton (Suffragan Bishop for the Diocese of Derby). Sir Lawrence John Verney, youngest son of the 4th Baronet, was a judge.

== Notes ==
Baronetage of the United Kingdom
Preceded by Farrington baronets	Verney baronets of Claydon House; 3 December 1818	Succeeded by Gordon baronets
