= Verney family of Middle Claydon =

English family

Arms of Verney of Middle Claydon, Buckinghamshire: Azure, on a cross argent five mullets gules

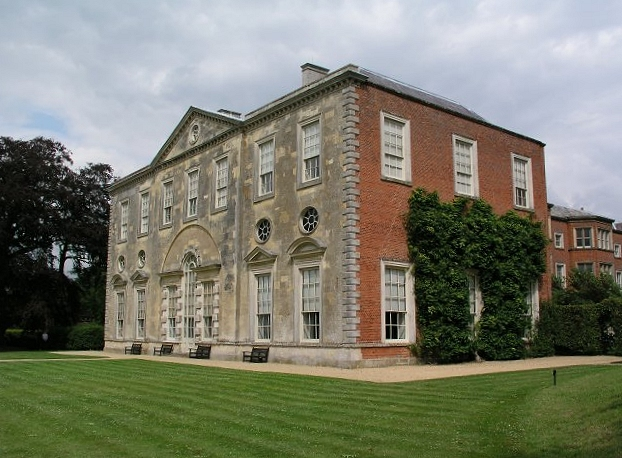
Claydon House, Middle Claydon, Buckinghamshire, the Verney family's residence since 1620

The Verney family purchased the manor of Middle Claydon in Buckinghamshire, England, in the 1460s and still resides there today at the manor house known as Claydon House. This family had been seated previously at Fleetmarston in Buckinghamshire then at Pendley in Hertfordshire. It is not to be confused with the unrelated but also ancient and prominent Verney family of Compton Verney in Warwickshire.

== Early history ==
The pedigree of Verney of Middle Claydon commences with Ralph de Verney (fl. 1216–1223), but the fortunes of the family were made by Sir Ralph Verney (c. 1410–1478). After settling in Buckinghamshire in the 13th century, the family had purchased Middle Claydon by the 1460s and it was during this period that Sir Ralph Verney became Lord Mayor of London in 1465 and M.P. for the city in 1472. Sir Ralph Verney's eldest son, Sir John Verney, married Margaret, heiress of Sir Robert Whittingham of Pendley. In 1525, Sir Ralph Verney's fourth son, of the same name, married Elizabeth, one of the six co-heiresses of John, Lord Braye.

== The courtier Ralph Verney ==
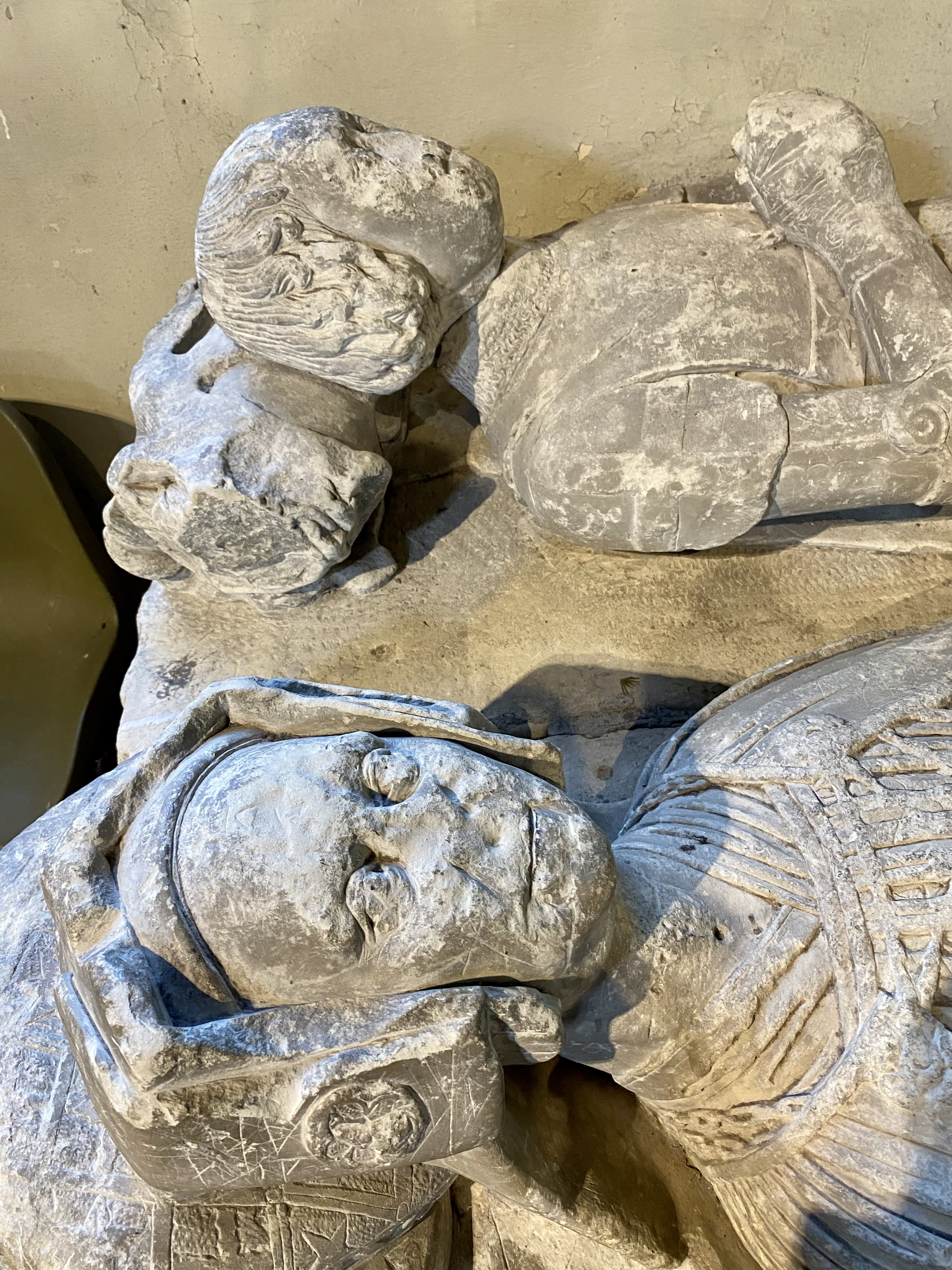
Effigies of Sir Ralph and Eleanor Verney in All Saints' Church, Kings Langley.

The Lord Mayor's second son was also called Sir Ralph Verney. He was steward of the Duchy of Lancaster for Bedford and Buckingham in 1485. He married Eleanor Pole, an aunt of Cardinal Pole. He was a servant of Elizabeth of York and joined the household of Margaret Tudor in Scotland as chamberlain, and subsequently Ralph Verney was chamberlain to Princess Mary. Lady Verney paid the painters Robert Fyll and John Reynolds for making heraldic beasts for the garden at Windsor Castle. At the Scottish court Lady Verney's two maiden attendants were given 11 gold coins strung as necklaces for a New Year's Day gift in 1506. Sir Ralph died in 1528 and is buried at Kings Langley in Hertfordshire; his chest tomb with effigies of the couple survive in All Saints' Church.

The other contemporary and younger Ralph Verney, according to some sources, was his nephew, the son of John Verney.

== Involvement in the English Civil War ==
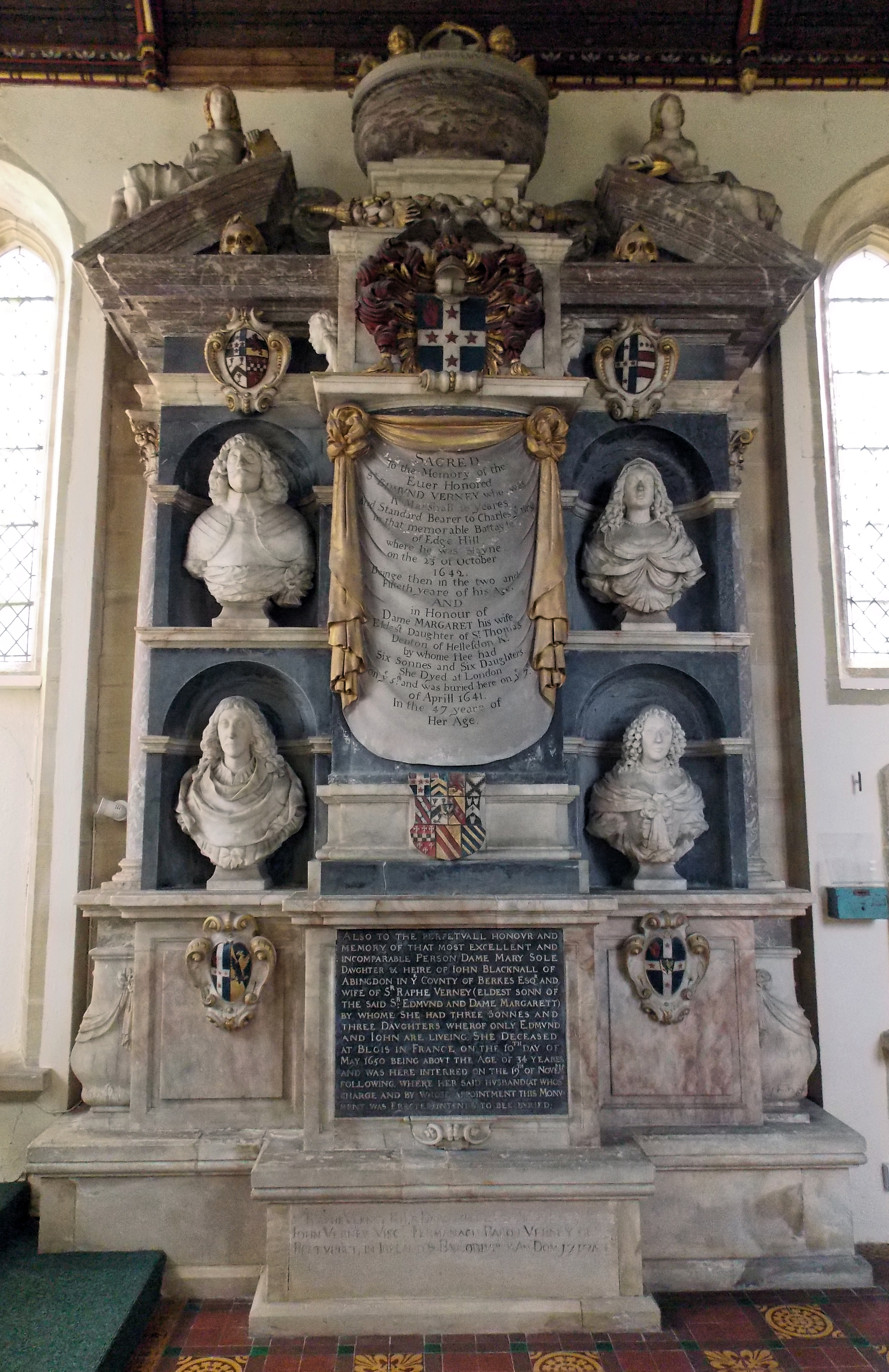
Memorial to the Verney family in Middle Claydon parish church, situated next to Claydon House

Sir Edmund Verney of Pendley (died 1600) left two sons, half-brothers, Sir Francis Verney (1584–1615), who became a soldier of fortune and a buccaneer, converted to Islam and died at Messina in hospital in extreme poverty, and Sir Edmund Verney (1590–1642) of Middle Claydon. Sir Edmund accompanied Prince Charles and Buckingham on the abortive mission to Madrid in 1623, and was knight-marshal to King Charles I. When the English Civil War broke out the royal standard was entrusted to him at Nottingham, and while defending it he was slain at Edgehill in 1642. His eldest son, Sir Ralph Verney (1613–1696), 1st baronet, sat for Aylesbury in both the Short and the Long Parliaments. He took the side of the parliament at the outset of the Civil War, but went abroad in 1643 rather than sign the Covenant, and his estates were sequestrated in 1646. He returned to England in 1653, and, though he refused to act against Oliver Cromwell, was subsequently reconciled to the Restoration government. His brother, Sir Edmund (1616–1649), had taken the king's side, and commanded the troops of the Royalist infantry at the Siege of Drogheda and was slain during the final assault.

== 18th century ==
Sir Ralph Verney's estates and honours descended to his son, Sir John (c. 1640–1717), who was created Viscount Fermanagh in the Irish peerage in 1703 and was father of Sir Ralph Verney, created Earl Verney in 1743. Earl Verney's sister, Lady Margaret Verney, by her marriage with Sir Sir Thomas Cave, 3rd Baronet, linked the Verney family a second time with the barony of Braye, and Braye family adopted the surname of Verney-Cave. Earl Verney's eldest son, John Verney, predeceased him in 1737, leaving a posthumous daughter, Lady Mary Verney (1737–1810), who was created Baroness Fermanagh in 1792. His second son, Ralph, 2nd Earl Verney (c. 1712–1791), was a friend of Edmund Burke, who entered parliament as Verney's nominee for Wendover. Earl Verney was an ardent supporter of the Whig interest, but received no reward from the party leaders. He rebuilt Claydon House with great splendour from the plans of John Adam, but, with his financial ventures, this brought him to bankruptcy. He died with no children of his own.

== 19th century ==
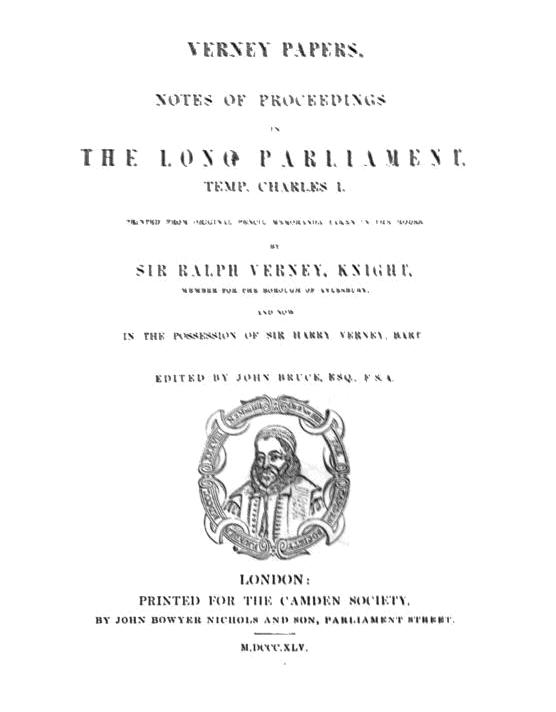
Verney Papers: Notes of Proceedings in the Long Parliament by Sir Ralph Verney, printed by the Camden Society.

The present Verney family, of Claydon Hall, Buckinghamshire, is descended in the male line from Felix Calvert (1596–1674) of Little Hadham, Hertfordshire. The Right Hon. Sir Harry Verney, 2nd baronet (1801–1894), was the son of General Sir Harry Calvert, G.C.B., created a baronet in 1818. He assumed the name of Verney in compliance with the will of Mary Verney, 1st Baroness Fermanagh, mentioned above. This lady died unmarried, leaving the paternal estates and the Verney portraits to her half-sister, Catherine Calvert (Mrs Wright), known thenceforward as Mrs Verney, on whose death in 1827 they came into the possession of her cousin, Sir Harry Calvert, who assumed the Verney surname. Sir Harry Verney entered the British House of Commons for Buckingham in 1832, and remained a member of the House with two short intervals for fifty-two years. He married in 1835 Eliza, daughter of Admiral Sir George Johnstone Hope, K.C.B., M.P., and secondly Frances Parthenope Nightingale, sister of Florence Nightingale. Frances, Lady Verney, collected from the mass of papers preserved at Claydon House the Memoirs of the Verney Family during the Seventeenth Century, which contain a charming picture of the life and manners of the country gentlemen of that day. A second edition, abridged and corrected by Margaret Verney, appeared in 1904. (Note: See also the Verney Papers edited for the Camden Society in 1853–1854.) An all-girls grammar school was named after her in the 1960s, the Lady Verney High School in High Wycombe, Buckinghamshire.

The Verneys who hold the barony of Willoughby de Broke descend from Richard Verney (1683–1711), who was granted the title 11th Baron Willoughby de Broke by the House of Lords in 1696. These Verneys had inherited the Verney estates at Compton Verney in Warwickshire through the marriage of Sir Richard Verney (died 1630) to Margaret Greville (died 1631), sister and heiress of Fulke Greville, 1st Baron Brooke. The male line was interrupted in 1853 when Robert John Barnard (1809–1862), nephew of the 16th baron, inherited the title. Robert took the title 17th Baron Willoughby de Broke, adopted the surname Verney and was the grandfather of Richard Greville Verney who sat in the House of Commons from 1895 to 1900 for SE Warwickshire and succeeded to the title in 1902. The family had left Compton Verney House by 1887 and it was finally sold in 1921.

== 20th–21st century ==
For the final quarter of the 20th century the 1818 baronetcy was held by Major Sir Ralph Verney. As of 2018, it is held by Sir Edmund Verney (born 1950). The family still has its home in Claydon House.

A second and separate Verney baronetcy (of Eaton Square) was created in 1946. As of 2018 the third baronet of this creation does not use the title; officially it has been dormant since the death of the second baronet in 1993.

The family's local history is reflected in placenames such as Verney Avenue and Lady Verney Close in High Wycombe, and Verney Close in Buckingham.

== See also ==
- Claydon House
- Middle Claydon
- Verney baronets

== Bibliography ==
- Adrian Tinniswood, The Verneys: A True Story of Love, War and Madness in Seventeenth-Century England, Riverhead Books, 2006. ISBN 978-1-59448-948-8.
