= Harry Verney =

Harry Verney may refer to:

- Sir Harry Verney, 2nd Baronet (1801–1894), British politician, MP for Buckingham three times between 1832 and 1885
- Sir Harry Verney, 4th Baronet (1881–1974), British politician, MP for Buckingham 1910–1918
- Harry Lloyd Verney (1872–1950), British courtier

== See also ==
- Verney baronets
