= Sir Harry Range =

Mountain range in British Columbia, Canada

Coordinates: 50°59′52″N 126°54′06″W

- Location within British Columbia

Geography
- Country: Canada
- Region: British Columbia
- Parent range: Pacific Ranges

The Sir Harry Range is a small mountain range in southwestern British Columbia, Canada, located on the west side of Huaskin Lake, between Grappler Sound and Seymour Inlet, north of Port McNeill. It has an area of 18 km^{2} and is a subrange of the Pacific Ranges which in turn form part of the Coast Mountains. The range was named for Sir Harry Verney whose son, Sir Edmund Verney commanded HMS Grappler while stationed at the Pacific Station from 1862 to 1866.

== See also ==
- List of mountain ranges
