= Harry Lloyd Verney =

British courtier (1872–1950)

Sir Harry Verney GCVO
- Born: Harry Lloyd Verney; 23 January 1872
- Died: 28 February 1950 (aged 78)
- Education: Eton College
- Spouse: Lady Joan Elizabeth Mary Cuffe (m. 1889)
- Children: 4, including Gerald
- Parent(s): George Hope Lloyd Verney; Harriet Julia Morforwyn Hinde
- Relatives: Sir Harry Verney, 2nd Baronet (grandfather); Sir Edmund Hope Verney, 3rd Baronet (uncle); Frederick William Verney (uncle)
- Awards: Legion of Honour

Sir Harry Lloyd Verney GCVO (23 January 1872 – 28 February 1950) was a British courtier who served in successive Royal Households of the United Kingdom.

== Early life ==
Verney was the second, but eldest surviving, son and heir of Col. George Hope Verney (who assumed the additional surname of Lloyd in 1888) of The Cedars, Esher and Harriet Julia Morforwyn Hinde. His father wrote the booklet Four-Handed Chess which was published in 1881.

His father was the third son of Maj. Rt.-Hon. Sir Harry Verney, 2nd Baronet (who married twice, first to Eliza Hope, daughter of Adm. Sir George Johnstone Hope, and secondly Frances Parthenope Nightingale, daughter of William Edward Nightingale and sister of Florence Nightingale). Among his extended family were uncles Sir Edmund Hope Verney, 3rd Baronet, Frederick William Verney, a diplomat and politician who was the father of his first cousin, Sir Ralph Verney, 1st Baronet. His maternal grandfather was Maj.-Gen. Charles Thomas Edward Hinde.

He was educated at Eton College.

== Career ==
He held the office of Gentleman Usher and Deputy Master of the Household to Edward VII between 1907 and 1910, and in 1909 was invested as a Member of the Royal Victorian Order. Between 1911 and 1931 he was Groom in Waiting to George V, and also served as Private Secretary to Queen Mary from 1919 to 1935. He was promoted to Knight Commander of the Royal Victorian Order (KCVO) in the 1927 Birthday Honours. He was also Queen Mary's Treasurer from 1932 to 1935. Verney served as Extra Groom in Waiting to the Prince of Wales between 1931 and 1936, when he was promoted to Knight Grand Cross of the Royal Victorian Order. He was an Extra Groom in Waiting to George VI from 1937 to his death in 1950.

He was also an Officer of the Legion of Honour.

== Personal life ==
He married Lady Joan Elizabeth Mary Cuffe (1877–1951), daughter of Hamilton Cuffe, 5th Earl of Desart and Lady Margaret Joan Lascelles (a daughter of Henry Lascelles, 4th Earl of Harewood), on 6 June 1889. Lady Joan was a Woman of the Bedchamber to HM Queen Mary. They shared an interest in embroidery. They lived at The Clochfaen in Llanidloes and were the parents of four children, including Major-General Gerald Lloyd-Verney DSO MVO. And Joan who married Hon Gustavus Hamilton- Russell son of 9th Viscount Boyne and Lt-Col Ulick Verney OBE who married in 1929 Esme Smith- Ryland.

Verney died on 28 February 1950. His widow died 27 February 1951.
