= Ralph Verney =

Ralph Verney may refer to:

- Sir Ralph Verney, 1st Baronet, of Middle Claydon (1613–1696), English MP for Aylesbury and for Buckingham
- Ralph Verney, 1st Earl Verney (1683–1752), English MP for Amersham and for Wendover 1741–1753
- Ralph Verney, 2nd Earl Verney (1714–1791), his son, English MP for Wendover 1753–1761, Carmarthen and for Buckinghamshire
- Sir Ralph Verney, 1st Baronet, of Eaton Square (1879–1959), Secretary to the Viceroy of India and the Speaker of the House of Commons
- Sir Ralph Verney, 5th Baronet (1915–2001), British Army officer, local politician and landowner
- Ralph Verney (MP for City of London) (fl.1459)
