= Edmund Verney =

Edmund Verney may refer to:

- Sir Edmund Verney (Cavalier) (1590 or 1596–1642), English royalist, MP for Buckingham 1624, New Romney, Aylesbury and Wycombe
- Sir Edmund Verney (soldier) (1616–1649), English soldier, son of the above
- Sir Edmund Verney, 3rd Baronet (1838–1910), Royal Navy captain and British MP for Buckingham 1885–1886 and 1889–1891
- Sir Edmund Verney, 6th Baronet (1950–2026)
