= Frederick Verney =

Clergyman, politician, diplomat (1846–1913)

Frederick Verney

Frederick William Verney (26 February 1846 – 26 April 1913) was a younger son of the long-established Verney family of Middle Claydon, Buckinghamshire. He became a Church of England clergyman, a barrister, a Siamese diplomat, and a Liberal Party politician, serving as a member of both the Buckinghamshire and London County Councils, and from 1906 to 1910 as the Member of Parliament (MP) for Buckingham.

== Early life ==
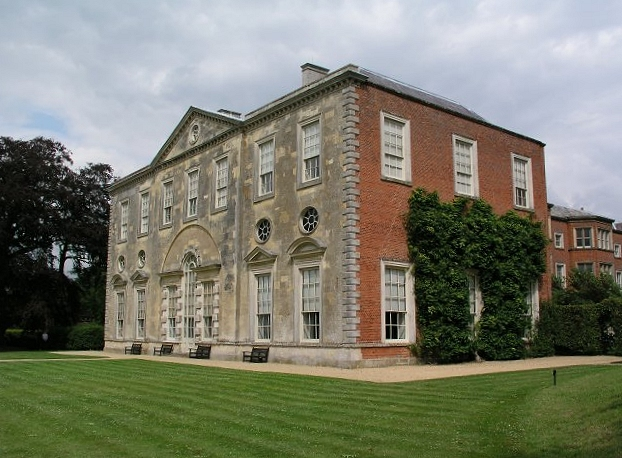
Claydon House in Aylesbury Vale, Buckinghamshire, inherited in 1827 by Verney's father Sir Harry

Verney was the youngest of four sons of Sir Harry Verney, 2nd Baronet and his first wife Eliza Hope, daughter of Admiral Sir George Hope-Vere. His father had been born Harry Calvert, inheriting the baronetcy from his father General Sir Harry Calvert, 1st Baronet, and had changed his surname to Verney in 1827 when he inherited the Verney family's estate in Aylesbury Vale, Buckinghamshire, including the John Adam-designed Claydon House. Sir Harry was a Liberal MP for a total of over 35 years.

Frederick was educated at Harrow and then at Christ Church, Oxford. He first became a Church of England clergyman for three years, serving as secretary and chaplain to the Archbishop of York, William Thomson, but gave up the church in 1873, and after training as a barrister he was called to the bar at the Inner Temple in 1875. In 1883 he took up the post of English Secretary and Counsellor to the legation in London of Siam, which was at that time a buffer state between the parts of South of Asia controlled by France and those under British rule. The Kingdom of Siam honoured him for his diplomatic services by appointing him as a Commander of the Most Exalted Order of the White Elephant.

== Political career ==
The Local Government Act 1888 created County Councils in England, and Verney became a councillor in the first elections, in 1889. He was a Buckinghamshire County Councillor for 18 years (from 1889 to 1907) and a Progressive Party member of the London County Council (LCC) from 1898 to 1907, for Peckham. He had unsuccessfully contested the 1895 LCC elections in Norwood.

He stood for Parliament four times before winning a seat. He was unsuccessful in Tunbridge at the 1885 general election, in Bath at the 1886 general election, in Norwich at the 1895 general election, and in Liverpool Exchange at the 1900 general election.

He was elected at the 1906 general election as MP for Buckingham (or Northern) division of Buckinghamshire. The seat had been held from 1885 to 1886 and from 1889 to 1891 by his older brother Sir Edmund Hope Verney, who was expelled from the House of Commons in 1891, and at various times between 1832 and 1885 by their father Sir Harry.

Frederick's main interest in Parliament was agriculture, and in particular supporting the creation of smallholdings. He was appointed in November 1909 as a member of a Royal Commission on the selection of Justices of the Peace (magistrates), which reported in July 1910. The commission's recommendations included the appointment of local committees which would monitor the effectiveness of magistrates and report of whether more magistrates were needed, and proposals to remove political bias from the selection process. However, Verney signed the report with a note dissociating himself from the proposal that "the Lord Chancellor and the Lord Lieutenants should refuse to receive any unasked-for recommendations from members of parliament or candidates for such membership in their own constituencies, or from political agents or representatives of political associations"; he claimed that this was outside the scope of the commission.

Verney was re-elected in Buckingham in January 1910, but at the December 1910 general election he stood aside from Buckingham to allow his nephew Sir Harry Verney, 4th Baronet to contest the seat. Sir Harry held the Buckingham seat, but Frederick was unsuccessful in Christchurch.

On 26 April 1913, Verney died aged 67 at his London residence of 12 Connaught Place, after a short illness.

== Family ==
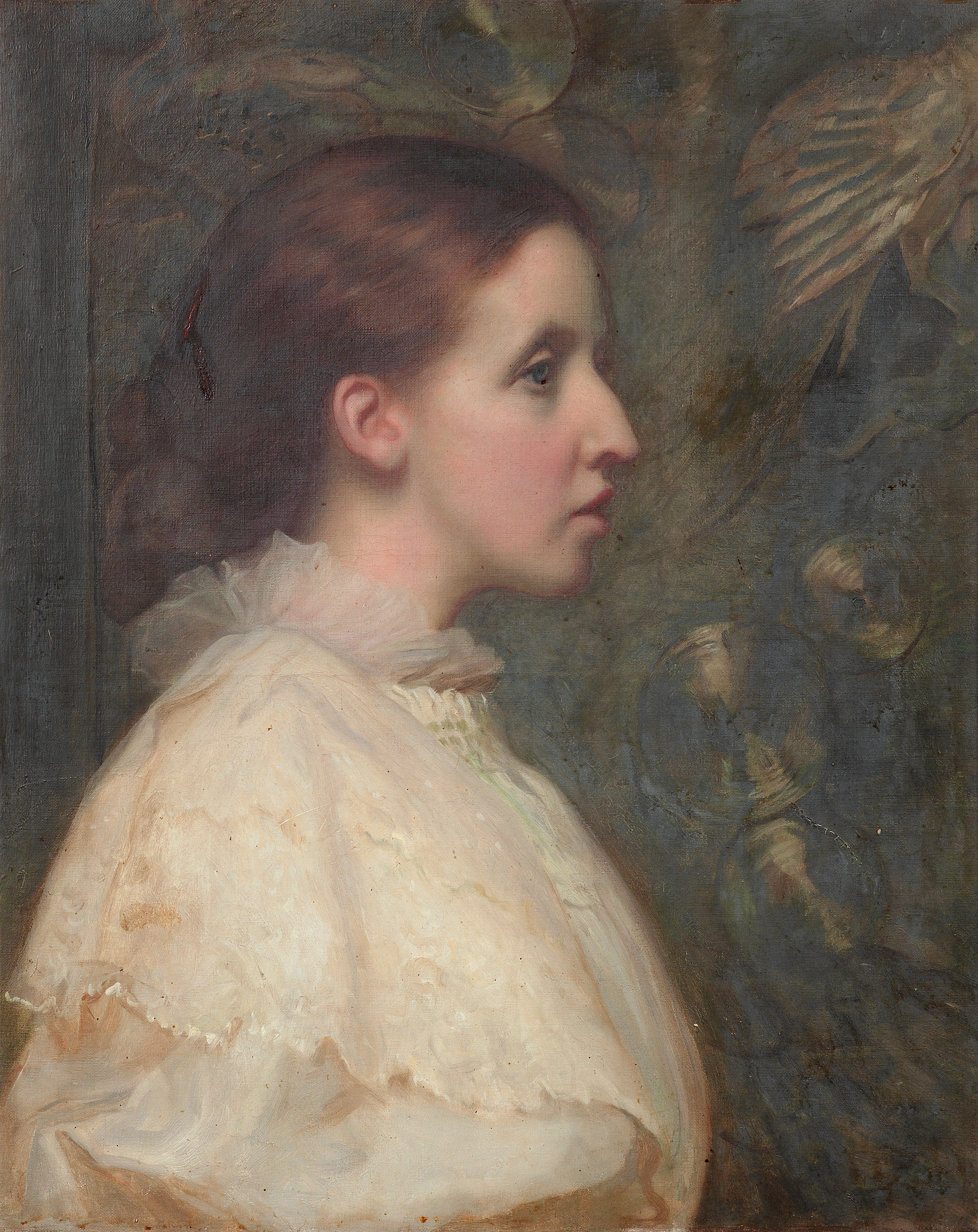
Maude Sarah Verney (William Blake Richmond)

Through his father's second wife, Parthenope Nightingale, Frederick Verney was related to Florence Nightingale, and corresponded copiously with her.

In 1870 he married Maude Sarah Williams (died 1937), the daughter of Sir John Hay Williams, 2nd Baronet, whose sister Margaret had married Frederick's older brother Edmund two years previously. They had three children: Ralph (1879–1959), and two daughters: Gwendolen Verney (1881–1932) and Kathleen (1883–1966).

Ralph fought in the Second Boer War and in World War I, became secretary to the Viceroy of India and to the Speaker of the House of Commons; he was knighted in 1928 and made a baronet in 1946.

Parliament of the United Kingdom
Preceded by William Carlile	Member of Parliament for Buckingham; 1906 – December 1910	Succeeded by Sir Harry Verney, Bt
