= Lawrence Verney =

British judge (1924-2014)

His Honour Sir Lawrence Verney TD, DL

Recorder of London
- In office 1990–1998
- Preceded by: Sir James Miskin
- Succeeded by: Michael Hyam
- Born: 19 July 1924
- Died: 25 July 2014 (aged 90)
- Education: Harrow School
- Alma mater: Oriel College, Oxford
- Father: Sir Harry Verney, 4th Baronet
- Relatives: Sir Ralph Verney, 5th Baronet (brother); Stephen Verney (brother); Edmund Verney (paternal grandfather); Margaret Verney (paternal grandmother); Victor Bruce, 9th Earl of Elgin (maternal grandfather)

Sir Lawrence John Verney, TD, DL (19 July 1924 – 25 July 2014) was a British judge. He was Recorder of London from 1990 to 1998.

== Life and career ==
Lawrence Verney was the son of Lieutenant-Colonel Sir Harry Calvert Williams Verney, 4th Baronet by his wife Rachel Gwenyfyr Catherine, daughter of Victor Bruce, 9th Earl of Elgin. His eldest brother was Sir Ralph Verney, 5th Baronet. Another brother, Stephen Edmund Verney, was Bishop of Repton from 1977 to 1985.

Educated at Harrow School and Oriel College, Oxford, Verney was called to the bar by the Inner Temple in 1952. He was deputy chairman of the Buckinghamshire quarter sessions from 1962 to 1971. He was appointed deputy chairman of the Middlesex quarter sessions (then a commission area of the Greater London quarter sessions) in 1971 and, upon the abolition of the quarter sessions became a circuit judge.

In 1990, Verney became Recorder of London, serving until his retirement in 1998. He was knighted in 1993. In 1995, he became the first circuit judge to sit in the Criminal Division of the Court of Appeal.
