= Claydon House =

Historic house museum in Buckinghamshire, England

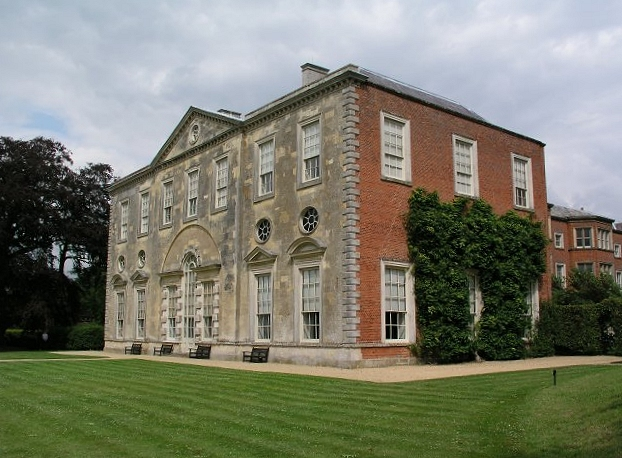

- Location within Buckinghamshire
- Interactive map of area around Claydon House

General information
- Status: Completed
- Type: country house
- Location: Middle Claydon, Buckinghamshire, England
- Coordinates: 51°55′19″N 0°57′20″W
- Construction started: 1751
- Owner: National Trust

Claydon House is a country house in mid-Buckinghamshire, England, near the village of Middle Claydon. It was built between 1757 and 1771 and is now owned by the National Trust.

The house is a listed Grade I on the National Heritage List for England, and its gardens are listed Grade II on the Register of Historic Parks and Gardens.

== History ==
Claydon has been the ancestral home of the Verney family since 1620. The church of All Saints, Middle Claydon lies less than 50 yards (46 m) from the house and contains many memorials to the Verney family, among them Sir Edmund Verney, who was chief standard bearer to Charles I during the English Civil War. Sir Edmund was killed at the Battle of Edgehill on 23 October 1642, defending the standard. His ghost is reputed to haunt the house. In 1661, following the Restoration of the Monarchy, Sir Edmund's son, Sir Ralph Verney was awarded a baronetcy by Charles II for his own and his father's loyalty and bravery during the preceding period of unrest, the Civil War and the Interregnum. Sir Ralph's second surviving son and heir, John Verney was later, in 1703, made Viscount Fermanagh and his son was Ralph Verney, in 1743, was created Earl Verney.

There is believed to have been a house on the site from at least the 1400s. The manor of Middle Claydon was purchased by Sir Ralph Verney, Lord Mayor of London, in 1463. However, the land was immediately leased to Sir Roger Giffard and the first record of the house on site, from 1539 describes the Tudor brick H-shaped manor house of the Giffards. Sir Edmund Verney, the Standard Bearer redeemed the lease in 1620 and from then on the house was the principal country seat of the Verneys. It received some modifications in the seventeenth century, particularly in 1654, when Sir Ralph Verney, 1st Baronet, returned from his political exile and began to rebuild the family fortune after the Civil War. The house was virtually rebuilt starting in 1757 by Ralph Verney, 2nd Earl Verney. Later in 1759, Lord Verney constructed a new west wing for the house faced in stone to provide a suite of state apartments. Following his election as MP for Buckinghamshire in 1768, Verney vastly expanded this house to create a new central rotunda entrance hall and ballroom wing. The original conception was of a mansion to rival the richer Earl Temple's huge mansion at Stowe, a few miles away near Buckingham. The house as it stands today is a fraction of its original planned size as the ballroom and rotunda were dismantled in 1791-92 after the Earl's death. Lord Verney ran into financial problems before the latter two wings were entirely completed, and had to spend the final years of his life on the continent to escape his creditors. The estate was inherited by his niece, Mary Verney, 1st Baroness Fermanagh in 1791, who sold off much of the family's land and sold the unfinished wing of the house off brick by brick.

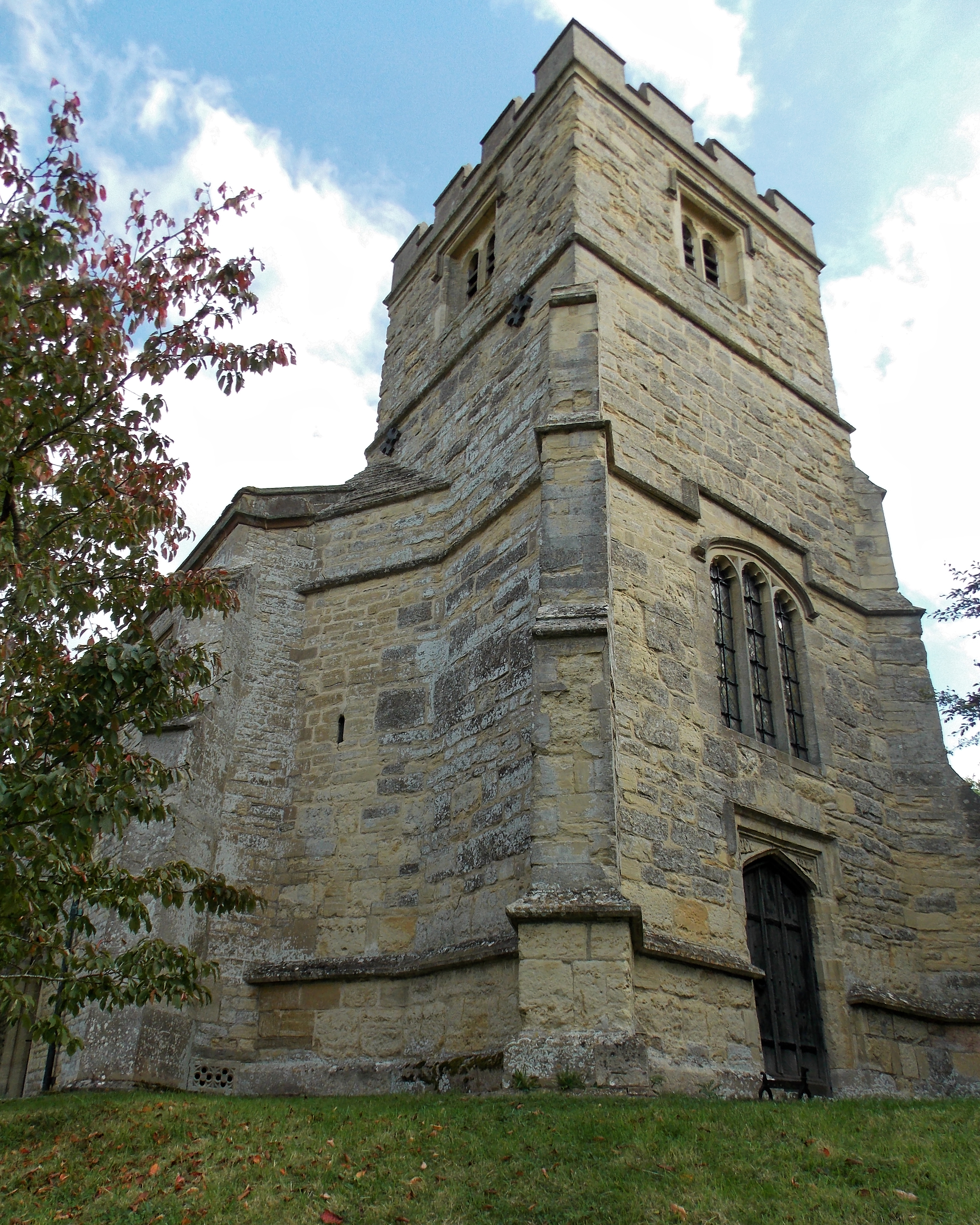
All Saints' parish church, Middle Claydon, in the grounds of Claydon House

== Exterior ==
The exterior of the house is quite austere – seven bays in total, on two floors, with a three-bayed central prominent elevation surmounted by a pediment. The fenestration is of sash windows. (The ground floor windows are crowned by small round windows suggesting a non-existent mezzanine.) The centre bay contains a large central venetian window on the ground floor.

== Interior ==
By contrast to the exterior the interiors are an extravaganza of rococo architecture in its highest form. The principal rooms: the north hall, a double cube room (50 ft × 25 ft × 25 ft high (15.2 m × 7.6 m × 7.6 m)) may have lost its adjoining hall under the lost dome. However, its magnificence remains. The broken pedimented door cases are adorned with rococo carving, by Luke Lightfoot, the most talented wood carver of the era, who worked extensively on the great mansion. His work can be found on the ceiling and the niches in the walls. The adjoining saloon is slightly more restrained in its decoration. However the ornate carving continues into the dado rails, and onto the Corinthian columns supporting the huge Venetian window. The third principal room was redecorated as a library by Parthenope, Lady Verney, in 1860. The plaster rococo ceiling remains in all its splendour.

A staircase of inlaid ivory and marquetry leads to the first floor. The walls of the staircase hall are ornamented with medallions and carved garlands reflecting the theme established in the main reception rooms. The wrought iron balustrade of the stairs contains ironwork ears of wheat, which rustle like the real thing as one ascends the flights.

On the first floor is the Chinese room, decorated in the chinoiserie style-an 18th century European interpretation of Chinese art associated with the Rococo period. Carved by Luke Lightfoot, the room features intricate wooden fretwork, pagodas, temples, and bells across the walls and doors. The room's central feature is a temple-style canopy alcove, which originally accommodated a bed.

Also on this floor is a small museum dedicated to the nursing pioneer Florence Nightingale, the sister of Parthenope, Lady Verney. In her later years Nightingale regularly stayed at the house.

== Claydon House today ==
The present Verney family, are the descendants of Sir Harry Calvert, 2nd Baronet who inherited the house in 1827. He was very tenuously related to the Verneys only through marriage. However, he adopted the name Verney on inheriting. The house was given to the National Trust in 1956 by Sir Ralph Verney, 5th Baronet. His son, Sir Edmund Verney, 6th Baronet, a former High Sheriff of Buckinghamshire, lived in the house until 2019.

Annually (usually the last weekend in July) at Claydon House, there is a hovercraft race meeting organised by the Chilterns Branch as part of the Hovercraft Club of Great Britain (UK) National Hovercraft Racing Series.

=== As a film and TV location ===
Claydon House has appeared in a number of films. Interiors were used for Emma in 1996. In 2013, Claydon House was used for interior and exterior shots for filming Far from the Madding Crowd, a British film version of Thomas Hardy's novel. In 2018, the interiors were used for The Aeronauts, and again in 2020 for Cinderella. The house also appeared in the third season of Bridgerton (2024) and Downton Abbey: The Grand Finale (2025). Claydon House also featured in episode four of David Dimbleby's 2010 BBC documentary series "Seven Ages of Britain".

== See also ==
- The Blacknall Map at Claydon House

== Sources ==
- Ash, Russell (1973). Folklore, Myths and Legends of Britain. Reader's Digest Association Limited. p. 271. ISBN 9780340165973.
- Estate Office (2012). "Claydon House". The Claydon Estate, UK. Archived from the original on 11 May 2008.
- Knox, Tim (1999). Claydon House. The National Trust. ISBN 978-1-84359-025-5.
