= James Miskin =

British judge

His Honour Sir James Miskin QC

Recorder of London
- In office 1975–1990
- Preceded by: Sir Carl Aarvold
- Succeeded by: Sir Lawrence Verney

Personal details
- Born: 11 March 1925 Hong Kong
- Died: 21 November 1993 (aged 68) Horsham, Sussex
- Education: Haileybury School, Brasenose College, Oxford
- Occupation: Judge
- Profession: Barrister

Sir James William Miskin, QC (11 March 1925 – 21 November 1993) was a British barrister and judge. He served as Recorder of London, the senior judge at the Central Criminal Court Old Bailey, from 1975 to 1990.

== Early life ==
James William Miskin was born in Hong Kong on 11 March 1925, the son of Geoffrey Miskin, general manager of the Hongkong and Shanghai Bank. Returning to England, he was educated at Haileybury School in Hertfordshire. He served in the Royal Naval Volunteer Reserve between 1943 and 1946, before going to Brasenose College, Oxford, graduating in 1949.

In 1951 he married Mollie Joan Milne, they having two sons and two daughters. The couple later divorced, and in 1980 Miskin married Sheila Joan Collett.

== Career ==
Miskin was called to bar in 1951 and developed a common law practice, principally in family and medical negligence work, being appointed Queen's Counsel (QC) in 1967. In 1971 he succeeded Desmond Ackner as counsel for the victims of the thalidomide drug in their long-running action against Distillers, finally settled out of court. A member of the Inner Temple, Miskin served as a member of the Bar Council 1964–67 and 1970–73, was leader of South East Circuit 1974–75 and became a Bencher in 1976.

Although his practice was mainly civil, as his career progressed he held a number part-time judicial appointments in the criminal courts, including Deputy Chairman of the Hertfordshire Quarter Sessions 1968–71 and Recorder of the Crown Court 1972–75. In addition, between 1972–75, he acted as chairman of the London School of Economics board of discipline and was Appeals Steward of the British Boxing Board of Control.

In 1975 Miskin was appointed Recorder of London, the senior judge at the Central Criminal Court, Old Bailey, a post that tries many of England's most serious criminal cases. As second citizen of the City of London after the Lord Mayor, the role also involves a number of ceremonial and administrative functions.

In his first years as Recorder, Miskin was generally well thought of as a judge, being seen as fair minded as well as courteous, kind and helpful to advocates. He was often outspoken, expressing views on justice issues including prison funding, raising the minimum age for jurors and re-introduction of capital punishment for premeditated murder. However, as ill-health overtook him in his later years as a judge, his personality and judicial performance deteriorated. His sentencing became more erratic and he publicly used ethnic slurs including, at a Mansion House dinner, referring to 'nig-nogs' and 'murderous Sikhs'. Shortly before his retirement, he cast doubt upon the innocence of the Guildford four after their conviction was quashed. This behaviour was subsequently attributed to the early onset of Alzheimer's disease.

Miskin retired in 1990, and died at his home in Horsham, Sussex on 21 November 1993 aged 68 from Alzheimer's disease.

For many years Miskin was a lieutenant of the City of London and was knighted in the 1983 Birthday Honours list.

Legal offices
| Preceded by Carl Aarvold | Recorder of London; 1975 – 1990 | Succeeded by Lawrence Verney |
