= Verney baronets of Eaton Square (1946) =

Escutcheon of the Verney baronets of Eaton Square

The Verney baronetcy, of Eaton Square in the City of Westminster, was created in the Baronetage of the United Kingdom on 16 July 1946 for Ralph Verney, Military Secretary to the Viceroy of India from 1916 to 1921 and Secretary to the Speaker of the House of Commons from 1921 to 1955. He was the son of Frederick William Verney, youngest son of the 2nd Baronet of the 1818 creation. He was succeeded by his son, the 2nd Baronet, a painter, illustrator and author.

As of 2026 the title is dormant.

== Verney baronets, of Eaton Square (1946) ==
- Sir Ralph Verney (1879–1959)
- Sir John Verney, 2nd Baronet (1913–1993), English artist and writer
- Sir John Sebastian Verney, 3rd Baronet (born 1945) does not use the title.

There is no heir to the baronetcy.

== Extended family ==
David Verney, younger son of the 1st Baronet, was High Sheriff of Cornwall in 1964.
