= Adrian Tinniswood =

British historian and writer

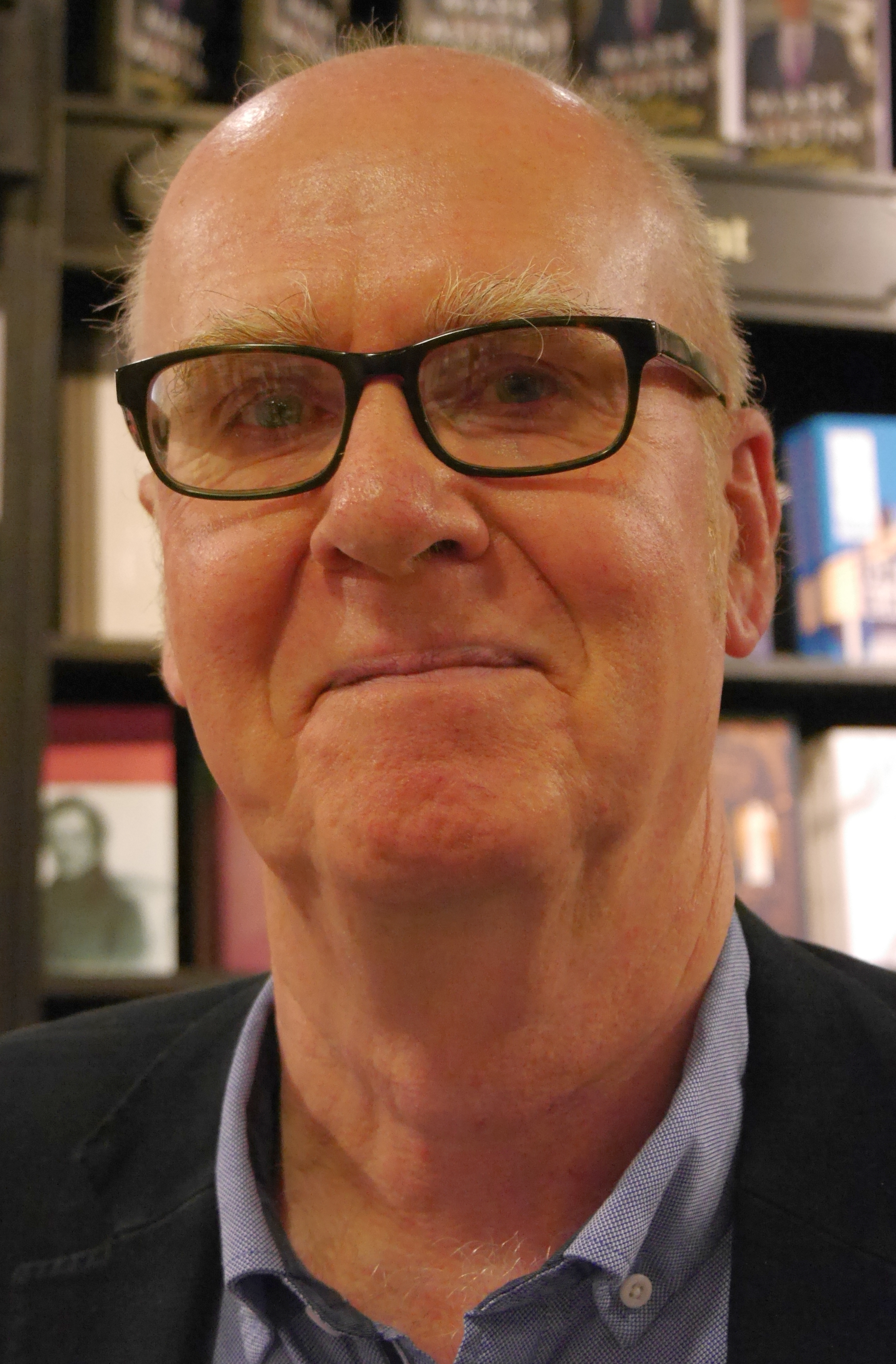
Adrian Tinniswood, Hatchards, London, November 2018

Adrian John Tinniswood OBE FSA (born 11 October 1954) is an English writer and historian. He is currently Professor of English Social History at the University of Buckingham.

Tinniswood studied English and Philosophy at Southampton University and was awarded an MPhil at Leicester University. He was a regional chair of the Heritage Lottery Fund (2004–10) and a member of the National Trust's Council and its Regional Committee for the South-West, and has served as a trustee on a number of boards, including the Bishop's Palace Wells, Bath Preservation Trust and the Holburne Museum. He is currently a trustee of the Leeds Castle Foundation and a member of the Cathedral Council and of the Fabric Advisory Committee, both at Wells Cathedral.

Tinniswood has often acted as a consultant to the National Trust, and has lectured at several universities in both the United Kingdom and United States, including the University of Oxford and the University of California, Berkeley. He is a Senior Research Fellow at the University of Buckingham's Humanities Research Institute and Director of Buckingham's Country House Studies programme.

He was appointed Officer of the Order of the British Empire (OBE) in the 2013 Birthday Honours for services to heritage.

== Selected works ==
- Historic Houses of the National Trust (1992)
- Belton House, Lincolnshire (1992)
- Country Houses from the Air (1994)
- Life in the English Country Cottage (1996)
- Travels with Pevsner 1 &2 (1997, 1998)
- Visions of Power: Architecture and Ambition from Ancient Rome to Modern Paris (1998)
- A History of Country House Visiting (1989); later published by the National Trust of London as The Polite Tourist: A History of Country House Visiting (1998)
- His Invention So Fertile: A Life of Christopher Wren (2001)
- By Permission of Heaven: The True Story of the Great Fire of London (2003)
- The Verneys: A True Story of Love, War, and Madness in Seventeenth-Century England (2007)
- Pirates of Barbary: Corsairs, Conquests and Captivity in the Seventeenth-Century Mediterranean (2010)
- The Rainborowes: Pirates, Puritans and a Family's Quest for the Promised Land (2013)
- The Long Weekend: Life in the English Country House Between the Wars (2016)
- Mount Stewart, County Down: A Souvenir Guide. Swindon: National Trust ISBN 978-1-84359-306-5 OCLC 1048756779 (2018)
- Behind the Throne: A Domestic History of the British Royal Household (2018)
- The House Party: A Short History of Leisure, Pleasure and the Country House Weekend (2019)
- The Royal Society and the Invention of Modern Science (2019)
- Hinton Ampner (2020)
- Noble Ambitions: The Fall and Rise of the Post-War Country House (2021)
- The Power and the Glory: The Country House Before the Great War (2024)
- The Houses of Guinness: The Lives, Homes and Fortunes of the Great Brewing Dynasty (2025)
