= Gordon baronets of Northcourt, Isle of Wight (1818) =

Escutcheon of the Gordon baronets of Northcourt

The Gordon baronetcy of Northcourt in the Isle of Wight was created in the Baronetage of the United Kingdom on 5 December 1818 for James Willoughby Gordon. The son of Francis Grant-Gordon RN (birth name Francis Grant), he was an army officer and military secretary to Prince Frederick, Duke of York and Albany from 1804 to 1809, when the Duke was commander-in-chief.

== Gordon baronets of Northcourt, Isle of Wight (1818) ==
- Sir James Willoughby Gordon, 1st Baronet (1772–1851)
- Sir Henry Percy Gordon, 2nd Baronet (1806–1876)

The baronetcy became extinct in 1876, on the death of the 2nd Baronet.

== Notes ==
Baronetage of the United Kingdom
Preceded by Calvert baronets	Gordon baronets of Northcourt; 5 December 1818	Succeeded by Hervey-Bathurst baronets
