= Mackenzie Sound =

Bay in British Columbia, Canada

Coordinates: 50°55′00″N 126°42′00″W

Mackenzie Sound is a sound in the area of the Broughton Archipelago of the Queen Charlotte Strait region of the South Coast of British Columbia, Canada. It is located to the northeast of North Broughton Island. Watson Island is located in its entrance; to the west of Watson Island is Grappler Sound.
