= Parliamentary Secretary to the Board of Agriculture and Fisheries =

The Parliamentary Secretary to the Board of Agriculture and Fisheries was a junior ministerial office in the British government, serving under the Minister of Agriculture and Fisheries. The title changed to Parliamentary Secretary to the Ministry of Agriculture and Fisheries in 1919 and to Parliamentary Secretary to the Ministry of Agriculture, Fisheries and Food in 1957.

== Parliamentary Secretaries to the Board of Agriculture and Fisheries ==
- 1909–1911 Sir Edward Strachey
- 1911–1914 Auberon Herbert, 9th Baron Lucas of Crudwell
- 1914–1915 Sir Harry Verney, 4th Baronet
- 1915–1916 Sir Francis Dyke Acland, 14th Baronet
- 1916–1919 Sir Richard Winfrey
- 1917–1918 Charles Spencer-Churchill, 9th Duke of Marlborough
- 1918 George Goschen, 2nd Viscount Goschen
- 1918–1919 Charles Hepburn-Stuart-Forbes-Trefusis, 21st Baron Clinton
- 1919 Sir Arthur Griffith-Boscawen

== Parliamentary Secretaries to the Ministry of Agriculture and Fisheries ==
- 1919-1921 Sir Arthur Griffith-Boscawen
- 1921 Vacant
- 1921 Richard Onslow, 5th Earl of Onslow
- 1921-1924 Gilbert Heathcote-Drummond-Willoughby, 2nd Earl of Ancaster
- 1924 Walter Robert Smith
- 1924-1928 Charles Bathurst, 1st Baron Bledisloe
- 1928-1929 George Rous, 3rd Earl of Stradbroke
- 1929-1930 Christopher Addison
- 1930-1931 Herbrand Sackville, 9th Earl De La Warr
- 1931 Vacant
- 1931-1935 Herbrand Sackville, 9th Earl De La Warr
- 1935-1936 Herwald Ramsbotham
- 1936-1939 Charles Duncombe, 3rd Earl of Feversham
- 1939-1940 George Bowyer, 1st Baron Denham
- 1940-1941 Walter Guinness, 1st Baron Moyne (jointly)
- 1940-1945 Tom Williams (jointly)
- 1941-1945 Bernard Fitzalan-Howard, 16th Duke of Norfolk (jointly)
- 1945 Donald Scott (jointly)
- 1945 Bernard Fitzalan-Howard, 16th Duke of Norfolk (jointly)
- 1945-1950 Francis Hastings, 16th Earl of Huntingdon (jointly)
- 1945-1947 Percy Collick (jointly)
- 1947-1951 George Brown (jointly)
- 1950-1951 William Hare, 5th Earl of Listowel (jointly)
- 1951 Arthur Champion
- 1951-1954 Peter Carington, 6th Baron Carrington (jointly)
- 1951-1957 Richard Nugent (jointly)
- 1954-1957 Michael Hicks Beach, 2nd Earl St Aldwyn (jointly)
- 1955-1957 Harmar Nicholls
- 1955-1957 Williams Deedes

== Parliamentary Secretaries to the Ministry of Agriculture, Fisheries and Food ==
- 1957-1958 Michael Hicks Beach, 2nd Earl St Aldwyn (jointly)
- 1957-1960 Joseph Godber (jointly)
- 1958-1962 Geoffrey Noel Waldegrave, 12th Earl Waldegrave (jointly)
- 1960-1962 William Vane (jointly)
- 1962-1964 Rowland Winn, 4th Baron St Oswald (jointly)
- 1962-1964 James Scott Hopkins (jointly)
- 1964-1970 John Mackie (jointly)
- 1964-1970 James Hutchison Hoy (jointly)
- 1970-1972 Anthony Stodart
- 1972 Peter Mills
- 1972-1974 Peggy Fenner
- 1974 Robert Washington Shirley, 13th Earl Ferrers
- 1974 Roland Moyle
- 1974 Edward Stanley Bishop
- 1974-1979 Gavin Strang
