= Harry Calvert =

British Army general (1763–1826)

Lieutenant-General Sir Harry Calvert GCB Bt GCH
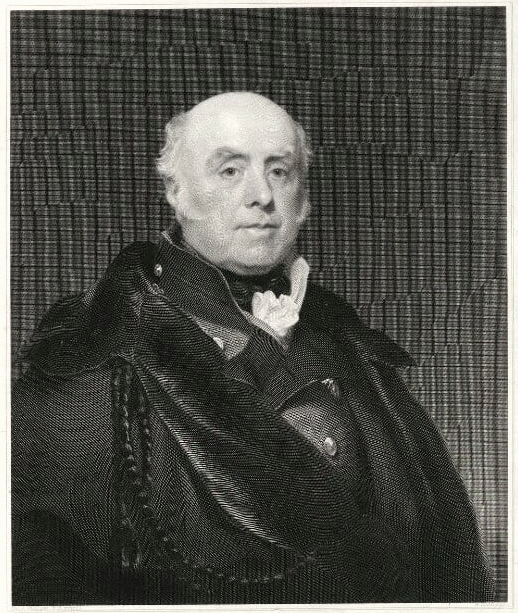
- Harry Calvert, engraving after Thomas Phillips
- Born: 31 March 1763
- Died: 3 September 1826 (aged 63)
- Military career
- Allegiance: United Kingdom
- Branch: British Army
- Rank: Lieutenant-General
- Conflicts: American Revolutionary War
- Awards: Knight Grand Cross of the Order of the Bath; Royal Guelphic Order

Lieutenant-General Sir Harry Calvert, 1st Baronet, GCB, GCH (31 March 1763 – 3 September 1826) was a British general.

== Military career ==
Calvert was born in 1763 at Hampton, near London, the only surviving son of Peter Calvert (grandson of Felix Calvert) of Hampton Court Palace and Mary Reeve. He was educated at Harrow, and at the age of fifteen, was commissioned into the 23rd Foot (Royal Welsh Fusiliers). The following year he served with his regiment in America during the American Revolutionary War. He was at the siege of Charleston, and served through the campaign of Lord Cornwallis which ended with the surrender of Yorktown. From 1781 to 1783 he was a prisoner of war.

== Flanders Campaign 1793–1795 ==
Returning to England in 1784, he was promoted Captain 1785, then next saw active service in 1793 in the Campaign in the Low Countries, where he was aide-de-camp to the Duke of York. Sent to discuss surrender terms with the garrison of Valenciennes, he was present at the Siege of Dunkirk 25 Aug-10 September, and the relief of Menin on the 15th. Detached to the Austrian staff of Coburg, he was present at the Battle of Wattignies 15/16 Oct. Promoted Lieutenant Colonel, he remained on York's staff 1794 and saw action at Beaumont (Troisvilles) 26 April. At the Battle of Tourcoing 17/18 May, he narrowly escaped capture with York and was forced to swim the Espierre's brook with him. He again saw action at Tournai (Pont-à-Chin) 22nd, the retreat to Antwerp, June–July, and in the Defence of Holland. In 1795 he was engaged on a confidential mission to Brunswick and Berlin. One of York's "most trusted staff officers" his Journals & Correspondence remains a vital source of information on the Flanders Campaign of 1793–95.

== Administrator ==
On Calvert's return to Britain he was appointed Deputy Quartermaster General at the Horseguards, then Deputy Adjutant General 1796. He was made Colonel of the 5th West India Regt and Adjutant General 26 January 1797. At this time

Calvert was a rising star, already Deputy Adjutant General, and engaged to a niece of Mr. Greenwood, a partner in Cox, Greenwood, Cox & Co., the army agents. Malicious gossip had it that this connexion was likely to do more for him than any show of martial brilliance, for the Duke of York was known to have heavy financial obligations to the firm. But Calvert had more than good looks and influence; he stood firmly for the (staff) college.

In 1799, having already served as deputy Adjutant-General, Calvert was made Adjutant-General to the Forces, holding this role until 1818. In this capacity he made improvements in the organization and discipline of the service. He improved the administration of the army medical and hospital department, introduced regimental schools, developed the Junior and Senior departments of the new Royal Military College, and was largely responsible for the founding of the Duke of York's School, Chelsea.

== Later life and death ==
Promoted Major General on 29 September 1803, and Lieutenant General 25 October 1809, in recognition of his work as adjutant general, Calvert was made a GCB in 1815, a GCH in 1817, and on retiring from office, received a baronetcy in 1818. In 1820 he was made Lieutenant-Governor of the Royal Hospital Chelsea, and elevated to Full General 1821.

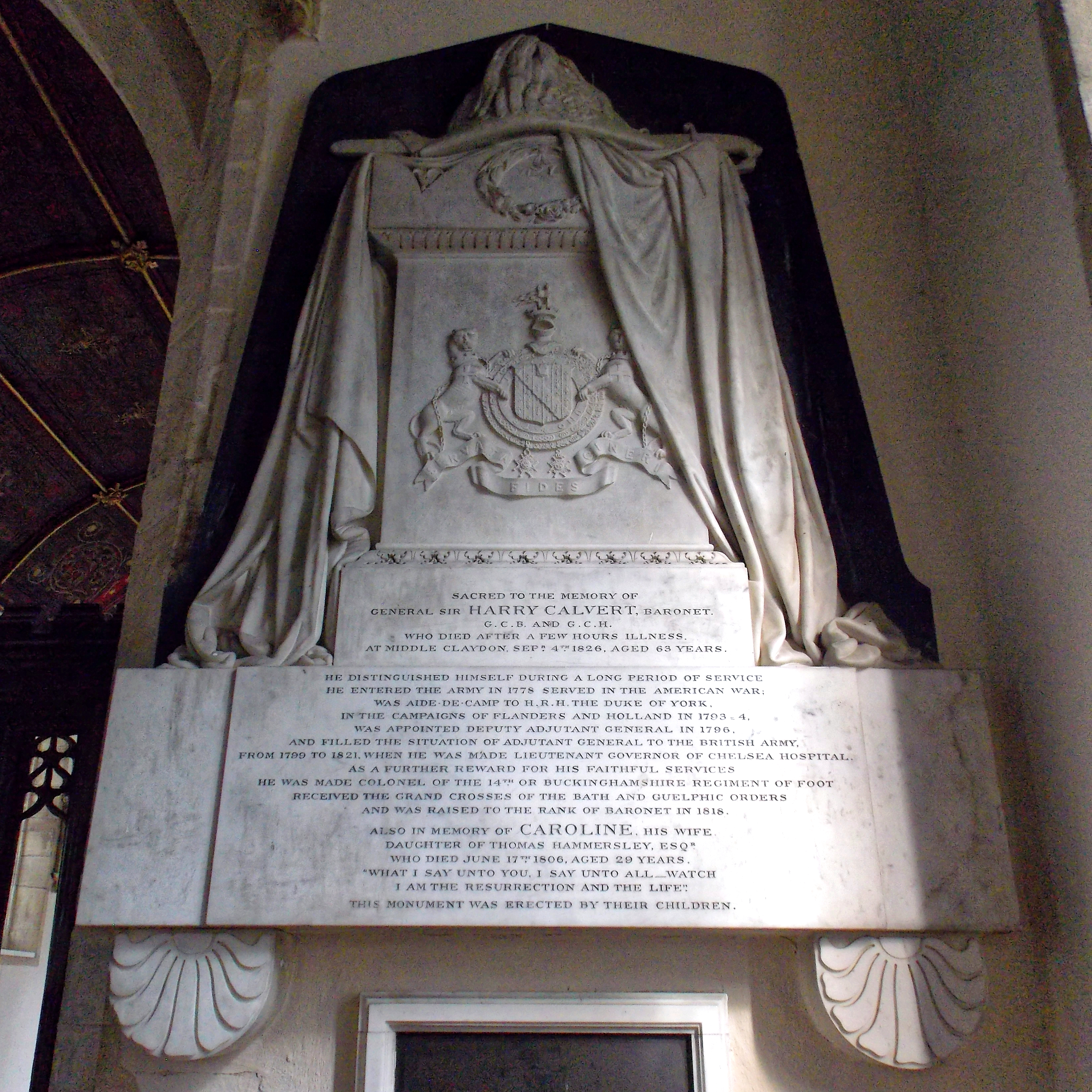
Monument to Sir Harry Calvert in All Saints Church, Middle Claydon

Sir Harry Calvert died on 3 September 1826, at Middle Claydon, Buckinghamshire. The following year, his son Harry ordered a monument in the form of a draped sarcophagus from Francis Chantrey.

== Family ==
Calvert married in 1799 Mary Caroline Hammersley, second daughter of the banker Thomas Hammersley. They had two sons and three daughters.

Military offices
Preceded by Sir William Fawcett	Adjutant General; 1799–1820	Succeeded by Sir Henry Torrens
Peerage of the United Kingdom
New title	Baronet (of Claydon House); 1818–1826	Succeeded by Harry Verney
