= Sir Harry Verney, 2nd Baronet =

English soldier and politician

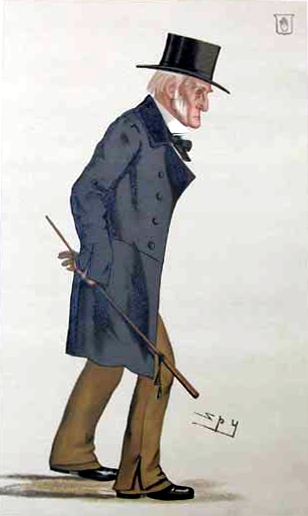
- Verney as caricatured by Spy (Leslie Ward) in Vanity Fair, July 1882
- Born: Harry Calvert; 8 December 1801; Claydon, Suffolk, England
- Died: 12 February 1894 (aged 92)
- Occupation: Politician
- Years active: 1832–1885
- Spouses: Eliza Hope (m. 1835; died 1857) Frances Parthenope Verney (m. 1858; died 1891)
- Children: 7, including Sir Edmund Hope Verney, 3rd Baronet and Frederick William Verney
- Parents: Sir Harry Calvert, 1st Baronet (father); Caroline Hammersley (mother)

Sir Harry Verney, 2nd Baronet PC, DL, JP (born Calvert; 8 December 1801 – 12 February 1894) was an English soldier and Liberal politician who sat in the House of Commons variously between 1832 and 1885.

== Background and education ==
Born Harry Calvert, he was the oldest son of Sir Harry Calvert, 1st Baronet and his wife Caroline Hammersley, second daughter of Thomas Hammersley. He was first educated at Harrow School, and then, aged fifteen, went to the Royal Military College, Sandhurst as one of its first cadets. In 1826, he succeeded his father as baronet and in the following year, he changed his surname by Royal Licence to Verney to inherit the Verney family estates of his cousin Mary Verney, 1st Baroness Fermanagh. From 1829, he studied at Downing College, Cambridge as a fellow-commoner, befriending Adam Sedgwick and William Whewell.

== Career ==
Verney joined the British Army for the 31st (Huntingdonshire) Regiment of Foot in 1819 and was sent to the country's legation in the German states Württemberg and Baden, learning during this time German, French and Italian. He returned to England in the following year and was allocated to the 7th (Royal Fusiliers) Regiment of Foot. From 1824, he served with the Grenadier Guards and from 1826 was private secretary in the office of the Commander-in-Chief of the Forces. Verney was meant to accompany Lord William Bentinck on his appointment as Governor-General of India, however during the journey was left ill in Rio de Janeiro, where he recovered, later hunting with natives in the Pampas and the Andes. His voyage home led him around Cape Horn on board a ship commanded by Sir Michael Seymour, and in 1829 he arrived in England again. Verney was promoted to major in 1831 and was transferred to the Royal Buckinghamshire Militia (King's Own) in 1844, retiring two years later.

Verney entered the British House of Commons in 1832, sitting as a Member of Parliament (MP) for Buckingham until 1841. After a six-year break, he was successful for Bedford and represented it until 1852. Verney was again returned for Buckingham in 1857 until the 1874 general election. In 1880, he was reelected for the constituency for the following five years. In 1885, in his final year in the House, Verney was sworn a Privy Counsellor.

Verney was nominated a deputy lieutenant of Buckinghamshire and a justice of the peace for the same county. He was a fellow of the Royal Geographical Society and one of the founders of the Royal Agricultural Society. Verney acted as chairman of the Buckinghamshire Railway Company and deputy chairman of the Aylesbury and Buckingham Railway Company.

== Family ==
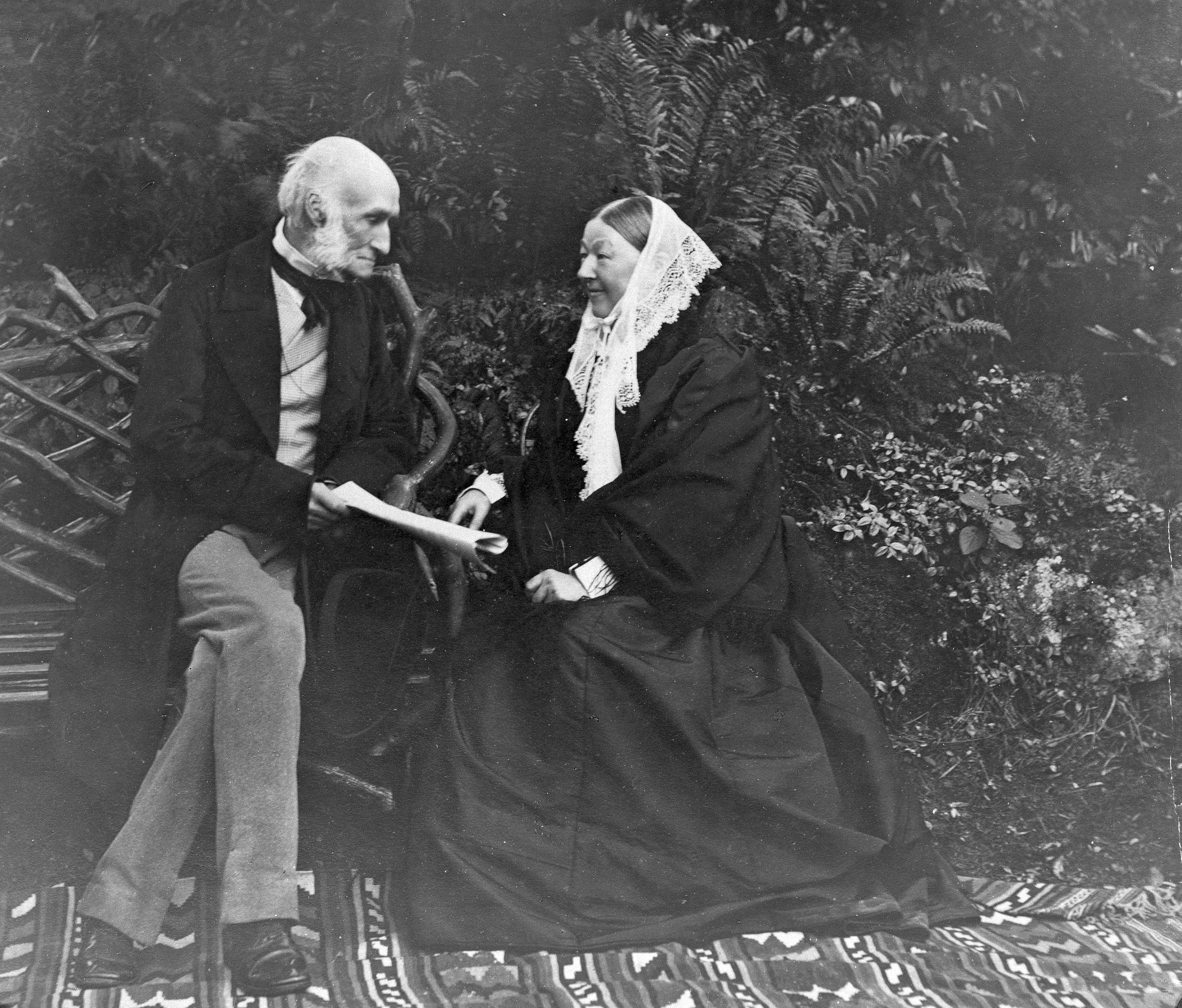
Verney with Florence Nightingale

On 30 June 1835, he married firstly Eliza Hope, daughter of Admiral Sir George Johnstone Hope, and had by her four sons and three daughters. After her death in 1857, Verney married Frances Parthenope Nightingale, daughter of William Edward Nightingale and sister of Florence Nightingale, on 24 June 1858. He died, aged 92 and was succeeded in the baronetcy by his oldest son Edmund. His youngest son Frederick was a diplomat and politician and father of Sir Ralph Verney, 1st Baronet.

== Legacy ==
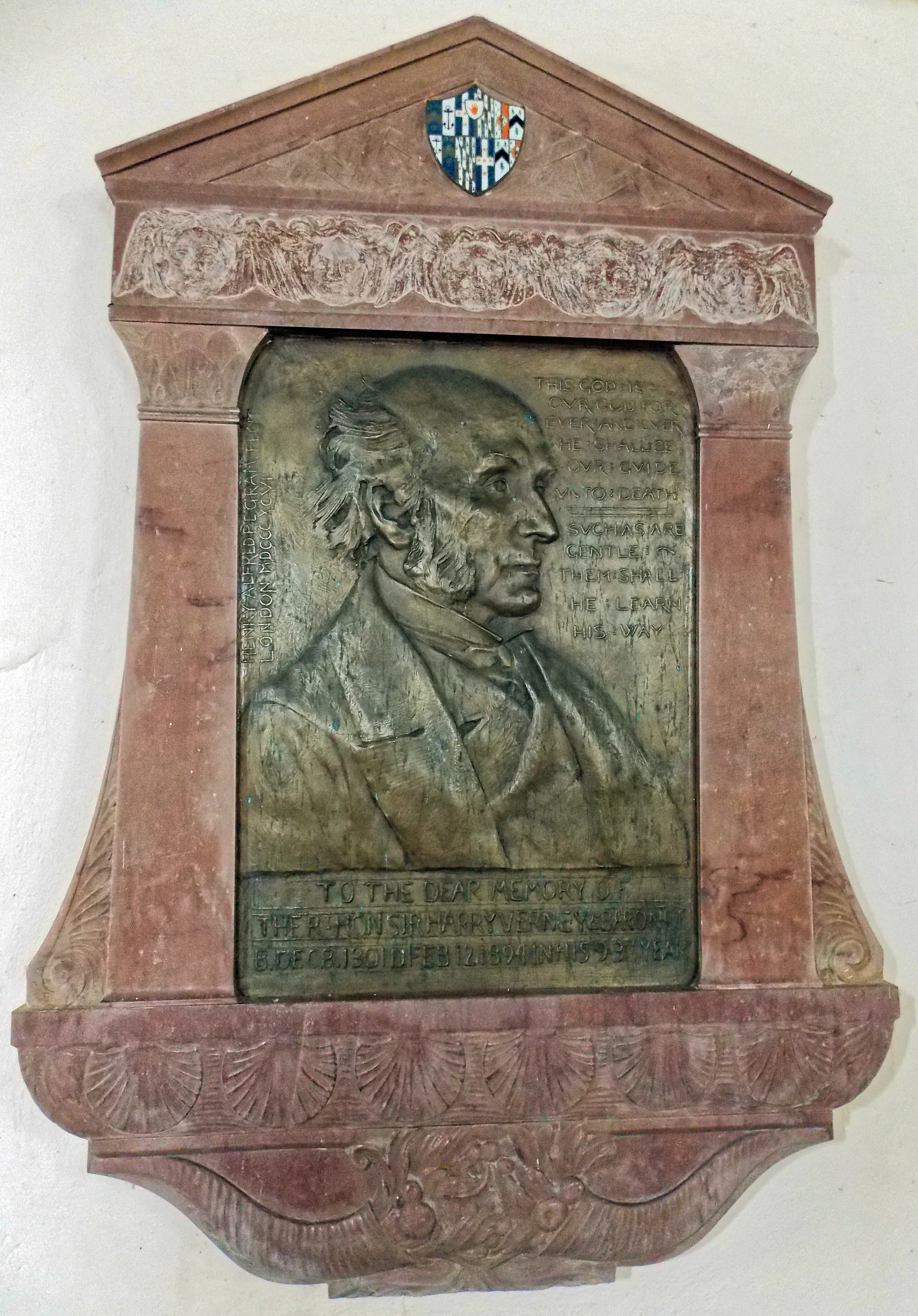
Sir Harry Verney tablet in All Saints Church, Middle Claydon

Verney was unusual in the sense that he gave his name to two railway stations in England, namely Calvert and Verney Junction stations in Buckinghamshire. Mount Verney, Sir Harry Peak and Sir Harry Range in British Columbia were also named after him. To this day, one of the campuses of the University of Buckingham (housing the Law School) is named "Verney Park".

Parliament of the United Kingdom
Preceded by Sir Thomas Francis Fremantle; Sir George Nugent	Member of Parliament for Buckingham; 1832 – 1841; With: Sir Thomas Francis Fremantle	Succeeded by Sir Thomas Francis Fremantle; Sir John Chetwode
Preceded by Frederick Polhill; Henry Stuart	Member of Parliament for Bedford; 1847 – 1852; With: Henry Stuart	Succeeded by Samuel Whitbread; Henry Stuart
Preceded by John Hall; Marquess of Chandos	Member of Parliament for Buckingham; 2-seat constituency until 1868; 1857 – 1874; With: John Hall 1857–1859; John Gellibrand Hubbard 1859–1868	Succeeded by Egerton Hubbard
Preceded by Egerton Hubbard	Member of Parliament for Buckingham; 1880 – 1885	Succeeded by Edmund Hope Verney
Baronetage of the United Kingdom
Preceded by Harry Calvert	Baronet (of Claydon House); 1826–1894	Succeeded by Edmund Verney
