= William Nightingale =

English Unitarian and father of Florence Nightingale (1794–1874)

- Born: William Edward Shore; 15 February 1794; Lea, Derbyshire, England
- Died: 5 January 1874 (aged 79); Wellow, Hampshire, England
- Spouse: Frances Smith (m. 1817–his death)
- Children: Frances Parthenope Verney and Florence Nightingale

William Edward Nightingale (né Shore; 15 February 1794 – 5 January 1874) was a noted English Unitarian and the father of Florence Nightingale, the founder of modern nursing.

== Biography ==
William Nightingale (known also as W.E.N.) was born William Edward Shore on 15 February 1794, in Lea, Derbyshire. His father was William Shore (1752–1822). His mother was Mary née Evans (1760–1853) who died at Tapton House, Sheffield. She was the niece of one Peter Nightingale, a lead mining entrepreneur, under the terms of whose will William Shore inherited the Lea Hall estate in Derbyshire, but also assumed the name and arms of Nightingale in 1815. He was appointed Sheriff of Hampshire in 1828. He had two sisters, Anne and Mary.

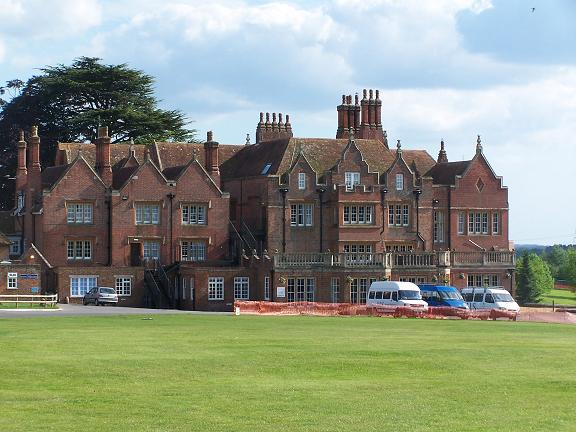
Embley Park in Hampshire, now a school, one of the family homes of William Nightingale, seen in 2007

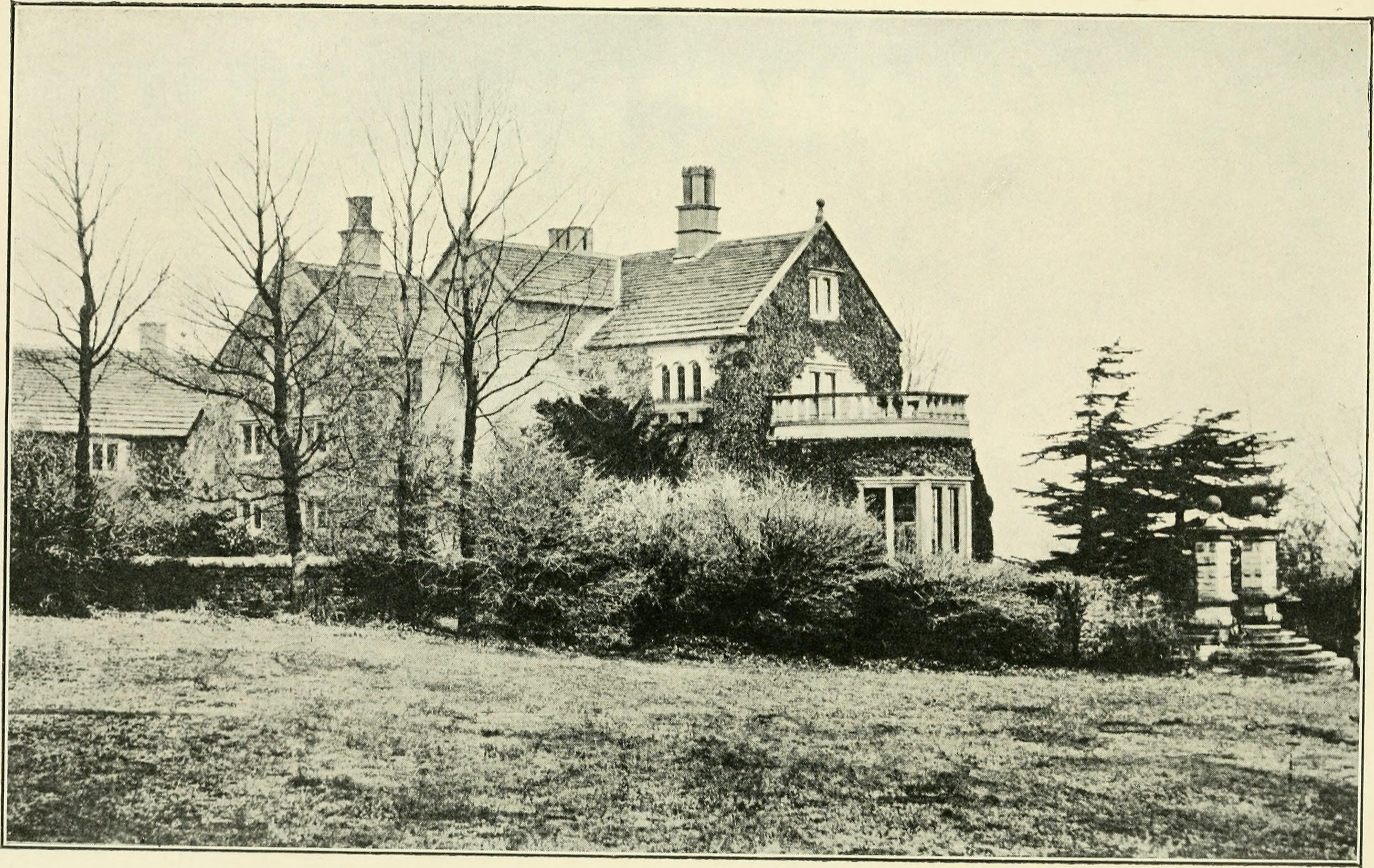
Lea Hurst from The Life of Florence Nightingale (1905)

By his early twenties, William Nightingale had an income of £8,000 which made him very wealthy. He liked to hunt, read, and follow social issues of his day. As well as Lea Hurst, he also owned Embley Park, an estate in Hampshire.

In 1818, when he was 23 and she was 29, he married Frances "Fanny" Smith (1789–1880), from Parndon in Essex, daughter of the Whig M.P. William Smith, a noted abolitionist. They had two daughters, both born while the family was on the Grand Tour of what would later become Italy. The elder, Parthenope Nightingale, was born in Naples and named after the city's Greek title. The younger was Florence Nightingale, best known for her nursing career but also notable in the development of modern hospital design and the gathering of health statistics.

Nightingale was the architect of Lea Hurst in Derbyshire, a 1825 house which was innovative for its time. Lea Hurst was designed to offer the Nightingale family considerable privacy. In contrast to the manors of other wealthy gentlemen, Lea Hurst was designed to blend in with its environment. It was made of the same local grey gritstone as other, less affluent houses were made of. 'Leahurst' survives and is a Grade II listed building.

When his daughters were of school age, Nightingale devoted himself to their education. As a consequence, Parthenope and Florence were educated well beyond what was typical of young ladies of their age.

William Nightingale died in 1874, leaving the bulk of his estate, including Lea Hurst and Embley Park, to his nephew, William Shore Smith (1831–1894; son of his sister Mary), who subsequently adopted the surname Nightingale.

== Interest in politics ==
William Nightingale had a keen interest in politics, and in 1829, he was appointed as the High Sheriff of Hampshire. In the summer months of 1834, he stood for parliament as a Whig candidate for Andover. He supported the Reform Bill and opposed any form of bribery for the encouragement of the electors. His views cost him the election, which left him shocked. As a result, he resolved never to be persuaded into political life again.

In 1838 he took his family on tour in Europe. In Paris he was introduced to Mary Elizabeth Clarke, an English-born salon hostess. "Clarkey" generally rejected female company and spent her time with male intellectuals, but she made an exception in the case of the Nightingale family. She and Florence were to remain close friends for 40 years despite their 27-year age difference.
