= HMS Grappler (1856) =

Gunboat of the Royal Navy

Coordinates: 50.213°N 125.3721°W

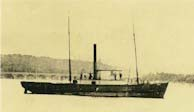
- HMS Grappler when a packet steamer

History

United Kingdom
- Name: HMS Grappler
- Ordered: 4 October 1855
- Builder: Money Wigram & Sons, Blackwall, London
- Laid down: 12 October 1855
- Launched: 29 March 1856
- Completed: By 12 April 1856
- Out of service: Sold into mercantile service on 6 January 1868
- Fate: Burnt, 3 May 1883. Broken up 1884.

General characteristics
- Class & type: Albacore-class gunboat
- Tons burthen: 232 68/94 bm
- Length: 106 ft (32 m) (overall); 93 ft 2.5 in (28.410 m) (keel)
- Beam: 22 ft (6.7 m)
- Draught: 6 ft 6 in (1.98 m)
- Installed power: 60 nhp; 211 ihp
- Propulsion: 1 set horizontal single expansion, direct-acting engine; 3 cylindrical boilers; Single screw
- Speed: 7.5 knots (14 km/h) under engines
- Complement: 36-40
- Armament: 1 × 68-pounder (95cwt) MLSB gun on pivot; 1 × 32-pounder MLSB; 2 × 24-pounder howitzers on broadside trucks

HMS Grappler was an Albacore-class gunboat of the Royal Navy. She served on what is now the British Columbia Coast from 1859 until sold into commercial service in 1868. She sank with significant loss of life as result of a fire in 1883.

== Naval service ==
The Grappler was one of about 100 Albacore-class gunboats that the Admiralty had built to meet the needs of the Crimean War. Like the others of her class, she was completed as that war ended. The Admiralty dispatched her, along with her sister ship Forward, to British Columbia following the Fraser Canyon Gold Rush in 1858. She sailed from England in August 1859 and reached Esquimalt nearly a year later on July 12, 1860. HMS Grappler, in later service as a packet steamer, brought the first settlers to the Comox Valley in 1862.

=== Vancouver Island service ===
On the Pacific Station Grappler played an important role in the early history of the Colony of Vancouver Island. Under the command of Lieutenant Edmund Hope Verney, Grappler transported the first 35 British settlers to a new settlement at Comox on 2 October 1862 at the request of Governor James Douglas. She continued to act as a transport for the settlement before other transport was available. She also helped enforce the regulation of the liquor trade in the colony. Her small size, steam power, and shallow draft made her useful as a lighthouse tender, for rescue, and for laying navigation buoys. however She and Forward were involved in the Lemalchi incident in the spring of 1863 when they hunted down and captured natives believed to have murdered some Gulf Island settlers. Forward used her guns to level a village on Kuper Island; she then transported her captives to Victoria where they were tried and hanged.

== Civilian service and fate ==
Grappler was paid off on 13 May 1865 and sold for $2,400 in 1868. She was modified by the addition of deck house and put into commercial service for the next 15 years.

On 29 April 1883, while in Discovery Passage about 4 miles south of Seymour Narrows, a fire was discovered in her boiler room. There were only two lifeboats aboard, one of which overturned. There were 36 survivors. Because the ship's records were lost, the number who perished in the sinking is uncertain but is believed to be between 70 and 90. At an inquest which followed, it was found that the vessel was not licensed to carry passengers aboard and the owners had failed to make provisions for their safety. Grappler was on a voyage from the Puget Sound to the Alaska Territory.

== See also ==
- Grappler Sound
