= Sir Harry Verney, 4th Baronet =

British Liberal politician (1881–1974)

Harry Calvert Williams Verney DSO
- Verney in 1920

Member of Parliament for Buckingham
- In office 1910–1918
- Preceded by: Frederick Verney
- Succeeded by: Sir George Bowyer

Parliamentary Secretary to the Board of Agriculture and Fisheries
- In office 1914–1915
- Preceded by: The Lord Lucas of Crudwell
- Succeeded by: Sir Francis Dyke Acland

Personal details
- Born: 7 June 1881
- Died: 23 December 1974 (aged 93)
- Party: Liberal
- Spouse: Rachel Gwenyfyr Catherine Bruce (m. 1911)
- Children: 8
- Parents: Sir Edmund Verney, 3rd Baronet (father); Margaret Hay-Williams (mother)
- Relatives: Ralph Verney (son); Stephen Edmund Verney (son); Sir Lawrence John Verney (son); John Hay-Williams (maternal grandfather); Sarah Elizabeth Amherst (maternal grandmother)
- Military career
- Allegiance: United Kingdom
- Branch: British Army
- Rank: Lieutenant-Colonel
- Unit: Royal Army Service Corps
- Conflicts: World War I

Lieutenant-Colonel Sir Harry Calvert Williams Verney, 4th Baronet, DSO (7 June 1881 – 23 December 1974), was a British Liberal politician.

== Political career ==
Verney stood as Liberal candidate for Basingstoke at the 1906 General Election. Shortly after, he was again Liberal candidate at the 1906 Basingstoke by-election. In the December general election he was elected to Parliament for Buckingham, a seat he held until 1918. He served under H. H. Asquith as Parliamentary Secretary to the Board of Agriculture and Fisheries from 1914 to 1915. He stood as Liberal candidate for Skipton at the 1922 and 1923 General Elections.

Verney succeeded in the baronetcy in May 1910. He was awarded the DSO in 1918.

Verney married Rachel Gwenyfyr Catherine, daughter of Victor Bruce, 9th Earl of Elgin, in 1911. They had five sons and three daughters. His eldest son and heir, Sir Ralph Verney, 5th Baronet, was a noted conservationist. A younger son, Stephen Edmund Verney, was Bishop of Repton from 1977 to 1985. Another son, Sir Lawrence John Verney, was Recorder of London from 1990 to 1998.

Verney was twice convicted for indecent assaults on boys under the age of sixteen, in 1937 and 1954.

Verney was the last surviving Liberal candidate from the 1906 General election. He died in December 1974, aged 93, and was succeeded to the baronetcy by his son, Ralph.

Parliament of the United Kingdom
Preceded by Frederick Verney	Member of Parliament for Buckingham; December 1910–1918	Succeeded by Sir George Bowyer
Political offices
Preceded by The Lord Lucas of Crudwell	Parliamentary Secretary to the Board of Agriculture and Fisheries; 1914–1915	Succeeded by Sir Francis Dyke Acland
Baronetage of the United Kingdom
Preceded by Edmund Verney	Baronet (of Claydon House); 1910–1974	Succeeded by Ralph Verney
