= Grappler Sound =

Sound on the Coast of British Columbia, Canada

Coordinates: 50°55′00″N 126°52′00″W

Grappler Sound is a sound on the Coast of British Columbia, Canada. It is within the Broughton Archipelago and located on the west side of Watson Island at the entrance to Mackenzie Sound. It was named for HMS Grappler.
