= Gerald Lloyd-Verney =

British Army general (1900–1957)

Major-General Gerald Lloyd-Verney DSO* MVO
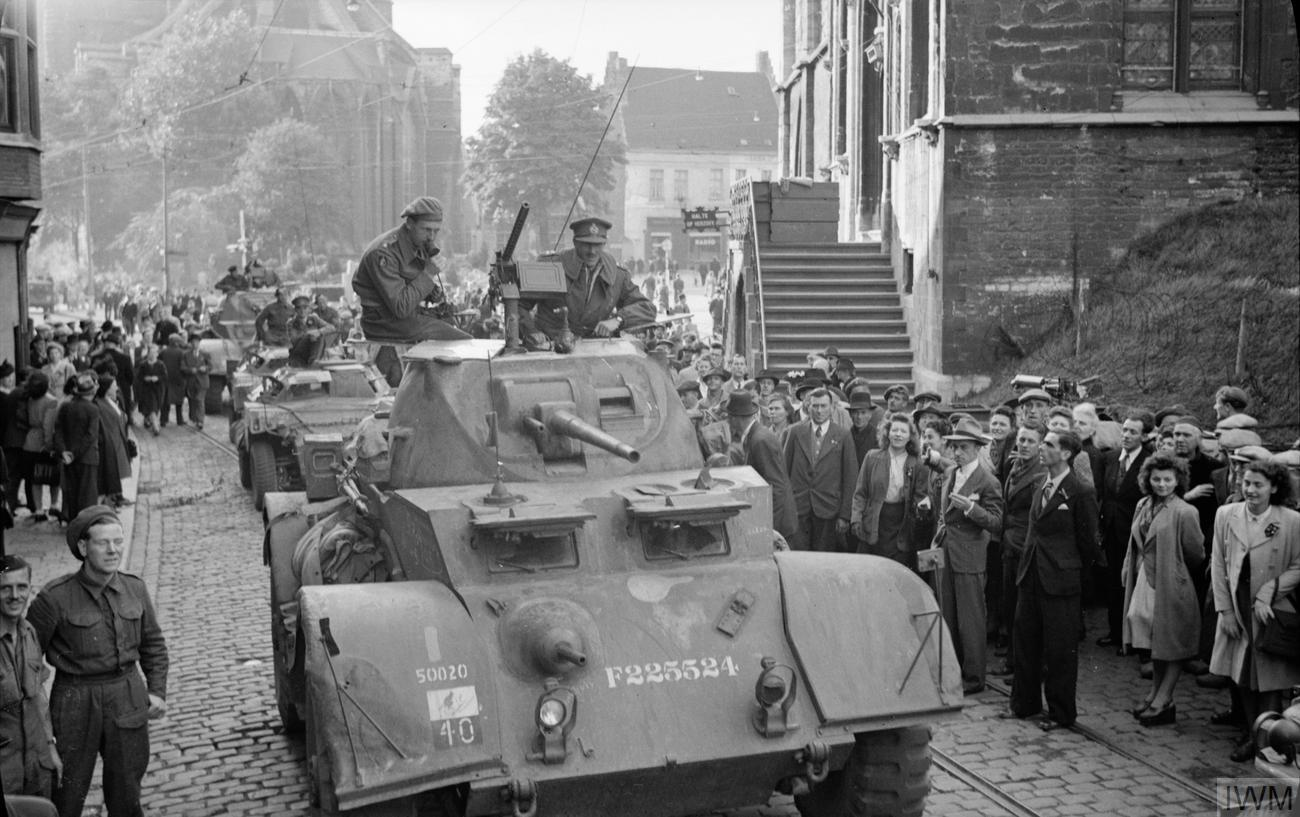
- Major-general Gerald Lloyd-Verney, GOC 7th Armoured Division, enters Ghent in his Staghound armoured car, 8 September 1944
- Born: Gerald Harry George Lloyd Verney; 10 July 1900; Kensington, London, England
- Died: 3 April 1957 (aged 56); Enniskerry, County Wicklow, Ireland
- Military career
- Allegiance: United Kingdom
- Branch: British Army
- Service years: 1919–1948
- Rank: Major-General
- Service number: 17944
- Units: Grenadier Guards; Irish Guards
- Commands: 56th (London) Armoured Division (1946–1948); 1st Guards Brigade (1945); 7th Armoured Division (1944); 6th Guards Tank Brigade (1942–1944); 32nd Guards Brigade (1942); 2nd Battalion, Irish Guards (1940–1942)
- Conflicts: Second World War
- Awards: Distinguished Service Order & Bar; Member of the Royal Victorian Order; Mentioned in Despatches (2)

Major-General Gerald Harry George Lloyd-Verney, DSO & Bar, MVO (10 July 1900 – 3 April 1957) was a senior British Army officer who commanded the 7th Armoured Division ("The Desert Rats") during the Second World War. He changed his name by deed poll from Gerald Lloyd Verney to Gerald Lloyd-Verney in 1941.

== Early life ==
Verney was the son of Sir Harry Lloyd Verney and Lady Joan Elizabeth Mary Cuffe. Educated at Eton College, Verney was Page of Honour to King George V between 1914 and 1917.

== Military career ==
Verney was commissioned into the Grenadier Guards in 1919. He became aide-de-camp to the governor of South Australia in 1928 and then, after attending the Staff College, Camberley from 1938 to 1939, transferred to the Irish Guards in 1939.

Verney served in the Second World War as an instructor at the Staff College in 1940 before becoming commanding officer of the 2nd Battalion Irish Guards during its conversion to tanks in the United Kingdom later that year. He was appointed commander of the 32nd Guards Brigade in the United Kingdom in 1942, commander of the 6th Guards Tank Brigade in the United Kingdom (before being deployed to Normandy) in January 1943 and general officer commanding 7th Armoured Division in North West Europe in August 1944. He was personally appointed by Bernard Montgomery to the 7th Armoured Division. He went on to be commander of the 1st Guards Brigade in Italy and Austria from 1944 to 1945 when he became military commander in Vienna. His last appointment was as general officer commanding, 56th (London) Armoured Division, in 1946 before retiring in 1948.

== Personal life ==
In 1926 Verney married the Hon Joyce Sybil Vivian Smith, daughter of Vivian Smith, 1st Baron Bicester, and together they had two children:

- Major Peter Vivian Lloyd-Verney (19 December 1930 – 12 October 2019), an Irish Guards officer who married first Caroline Evelyn Harford, daughter of George Anthony Harford, descendant of John Scandrett Harford of Blaise Castle, and Margaret Hotham (daughter of Admiral Sir Charles Frederick Hotham). They had three children together and divorced in 1982. He then married Elizabeth Anne Burke in 1983, daughter of Wing Commander Harry St. George Burke, of the Burkes of Clondagoff Castle, County Galway, and Evelyn Marjorie Stringer.
- Bridget Mary Lloyd-Verney, who married Michael Barry Sarson, son of Captain Maurice John Sarson, on 20 October 1951 and had four children.

Lloyd-Verney died on 3 April 1957 at Enniskerry, Ireland, aged 56.

Military offices
| Preceded by George Erskine | GOC 7th Armoured Division; August–November 1944 | Succeeded by Lewis Lyne |
| Preceded by John Whitfield | GOC 56th (London) Armoured Division; 1946–1948 | Succeeded by Robert Arkwright |
