= Frances Parthenope Verney =

English writer and journalist (1819–1890)

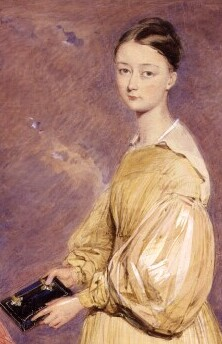
- Born: Frances Parthenope Nightingale; 19 April 1819; Naples, Kingdom of the Two Sicilies (now Italy)
- Died: 12 May 1890 (aged 71); Claydon House, Buckinghamshire, England
- Occupations: Writer, journalist
- Spouse: Harry Verney, 2nd Baronet (m. 1858)
- Parents: William Nightingale (father); Frances Smith (mother)
- Relatives: Florence Nightingale (sister)

Frances Parthenope Verney, Lady Verney (née Nightingale; 19 April 1819 – 12 May 1890), was an English writer and journalist.

== Early life and education ==
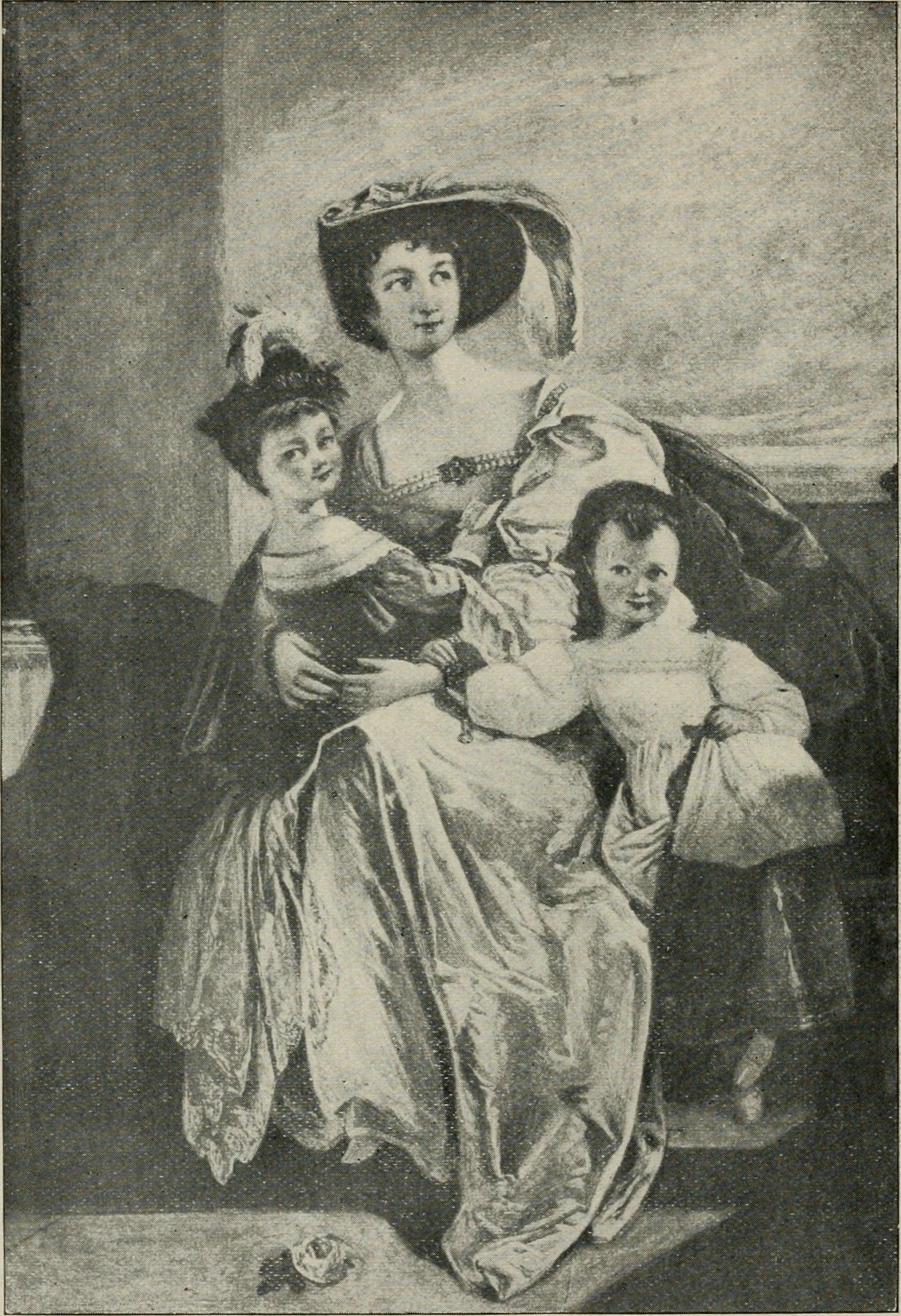
A portrait created of Mrs Frances Nightingale and her daughters Frances Parthenope and Florence Nightingale

Frances Parthenope Nightingale was born on 19 April 1819 in Naples in the Kingdom of the Two Sicilies (now Italy), during her parents' honeymoon. She was the eldest child of William Edward Nightingale, né Shore, (W.E.N) and his wife, Frances Smith, who was often referred to as Fanny by family.

At the time of the birth Frances was far from home and alone having her first child who was born small and weak. A week after her birth Parthenope had not gained sufficient weight and had begun to throw up blood. A local doctor was called in to help the baby and Frances accepted that she would not be able to nurse her child herself and would have to hire a wet nurse to save her child's life.

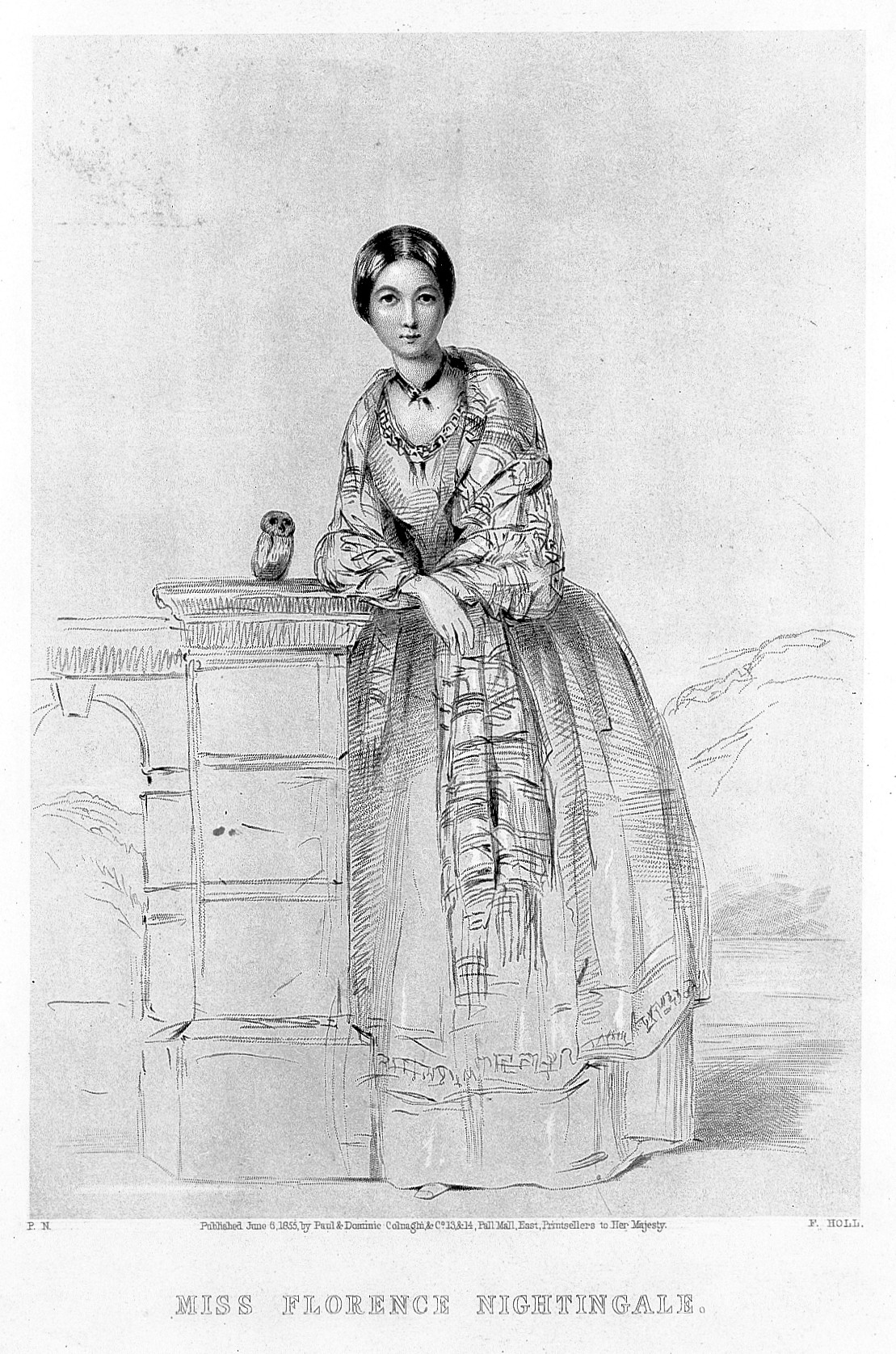
Print (1855) of Florence Nightingale by Francis Holl after a sketch by Frances Parthenope Verney

Frances Parthenope was named after the Greek name for Naples, Parthenope. Because she shared her first name with her mother, Frances Parthenope was often referred to by her middle name of Parthenope, as well as family nicknames such as "Parthe" and "Pop" as she was referred to by her younger sister. After her parents' three-year tour in Italy, Parthenope, her younger sister Florence, and their parents moved to back to England.

Parthenope and Florence were first educated at home by a governess, but because it was difficult for the Nightingales to "find a governess who would satisfy W.E.N's intellectual requirements or Fanny's standard of elegance and breeding", they later were taught, Greek, Latin, German, French, Italian, history, grammar, composition, and philosophy by their father. Despite being less scientifically inclined than her sister, Parthenope was fluent in French and developed a love for literature and art.

== Home at Lea Hurst and Embley Park ==
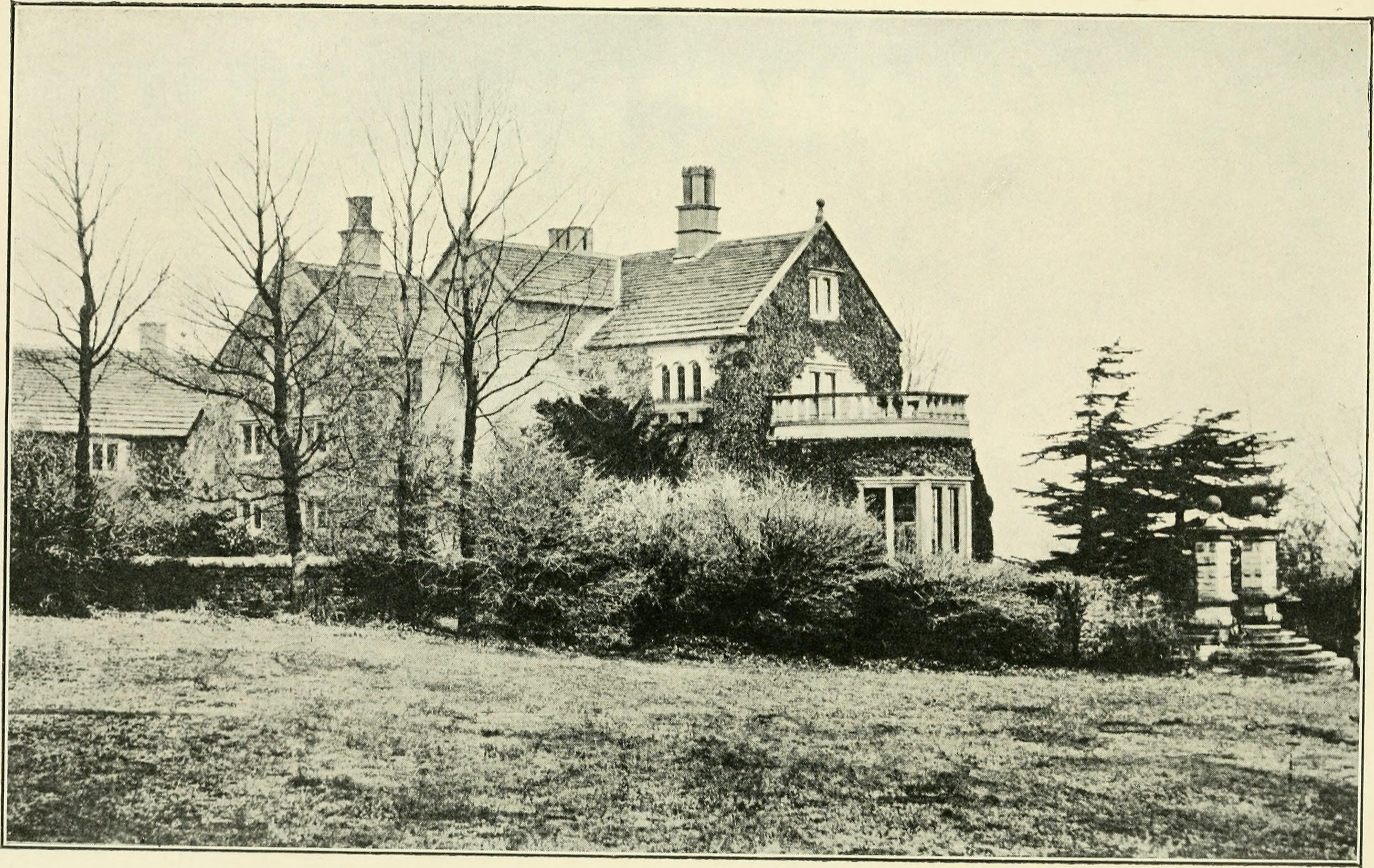
The Lea Hurst property of the Nightingale family

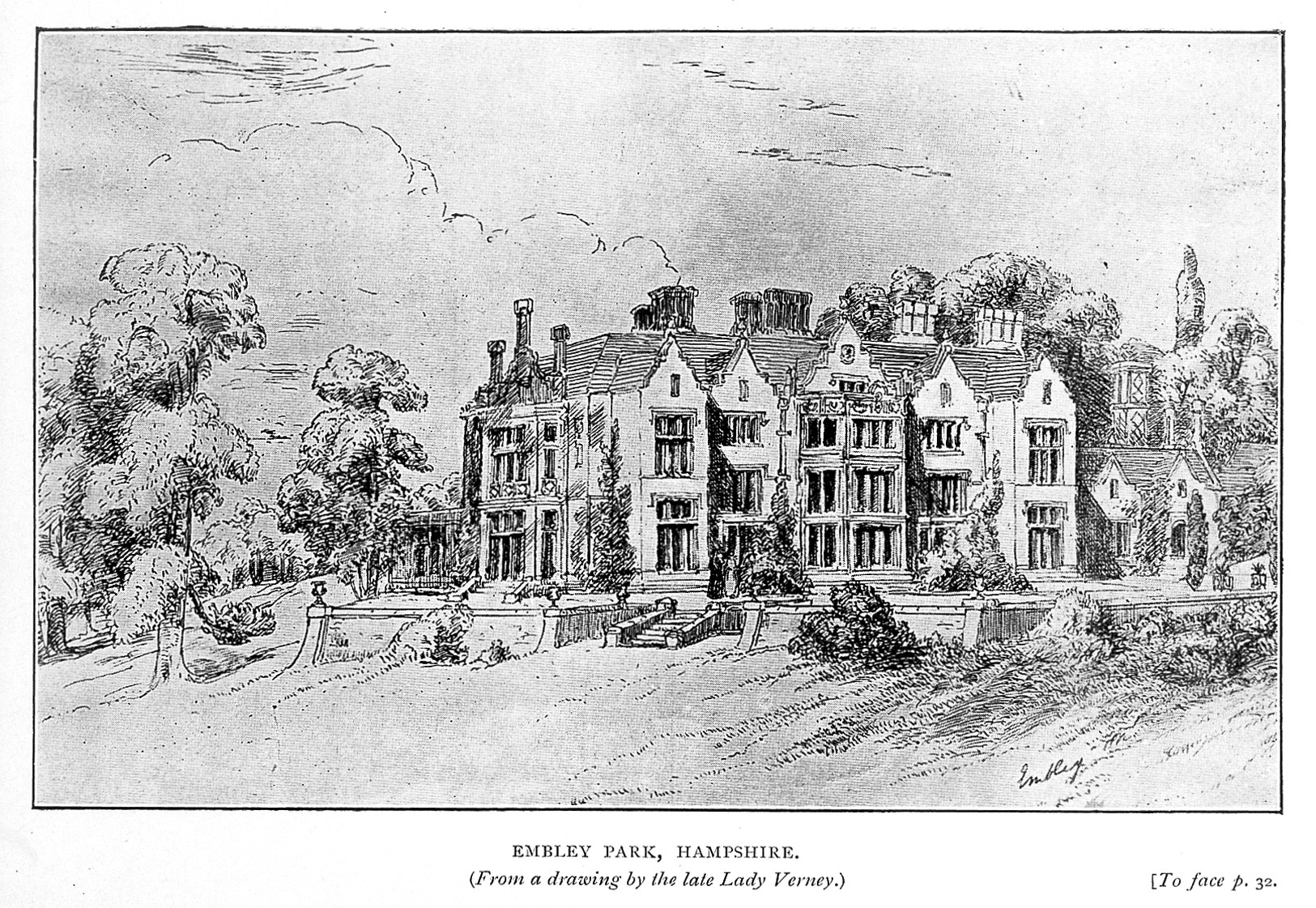
Depiction of Embley Park made by Frances Parthenope Verney

William Edward Shore (Parthenope's father's original surname) inherited the "Lea" property of his Great-uncle Peter Nightingale II, more often called "Eccentric Peter" or even "Mad Peter" in 1803. At "Mad Peter's" death, he left his "Lea property in Derbyshire to Parthenope's father, but W.E.N. did not officially come into control of the property until around the age of twenty-one. At the time W.E.N. came into possession of his inherited estate, he changed his last name to match that of the estate, that name was Nightingale. Before W.E.N. could manage the estate himself, William Shore, Parthenope's paternal grandfather, managed the estate for him. The estate grew while W.E.N. did, and at the time he came into control of his inheritance, he found himself to be a "very wealthy man". The property that W.E.N. inherited was called "Lea Hall" and was rather "run-down and inconvenient for a fashionable young family" and so the Nightingales never lived there, instead it was transformed into a farmhouse, and W.E.N. built a new house only "a mile or so away from Lea Hall" that would later be called Lea Hurst. The family lived solely in Lea Hurst until 1825, when they purchased Embley Park at the request of Fanny needing a home that was not so far from social life and circles. The Nightingale family "summered primarily at Lea Hurst on the edge of Derbyshire hills and spent the rest of the year, except for stays in London, at Embley Park".

== Parthenope's health struggles ==
Parthenope's health struggles did not stop at her traumatic start to life, but they continued to raise issues in her early adulthood and later. Ever since the birth of Parthenope, "W.E.N. and Fanny had been worrying about Parthenope's health" in February 1836 "their fears were revived and strengthened." Parthenope had fallen "ill with a high fever and a terrible cough" while W.E.N. was away from home and so the care of Parthenope was solely on the shoulders of her mother Fanny. Parthenope's fever and cough had led to consumption that the local doctors suggested would only be fixed if she were, "subjected to the full battery of leeches, bleedings, and blisters." Parthenope did recover within that same year, but not before it "confirmed all Fanny's fears for Parthe and increased her sense that she [Fanny] stood between her daughter and death." It was after this sickness that Parthenope became a "chronic invalid" in the mind of her mother and the mind of others. In the future instances of sickness Florence was often called upon to be the caregiver for Parthenope, which may have led to some of the strain in their relationship after teenagehood because Parthenope's, "chronic health aroused Fanny's protectiveness, and eventually cast the newly altruistic and always efficient Flo into the role of her sister's caretaker" and only as such in the eyes of her parents. As a result of the problems Parthenope had with health, her father, mother, and those all around her gave immense focus to Parthenope and focused less on Florence. Historians have considered these events of Parthenope's health scares to be crucial determinants of the relationship Parthenope had with her sister Florence.

== Public view and relationship with her sister ==
The relationship between Parthenope and her sister Florence Nightingale has been an area of consideration for some time. Florence Nightingale did much more in life that was recognised by the public, and so the relationship between Parthenope and her sister has more frequently been written displaying Florence in a more positive light and Parthenope as more of the evil older sister.

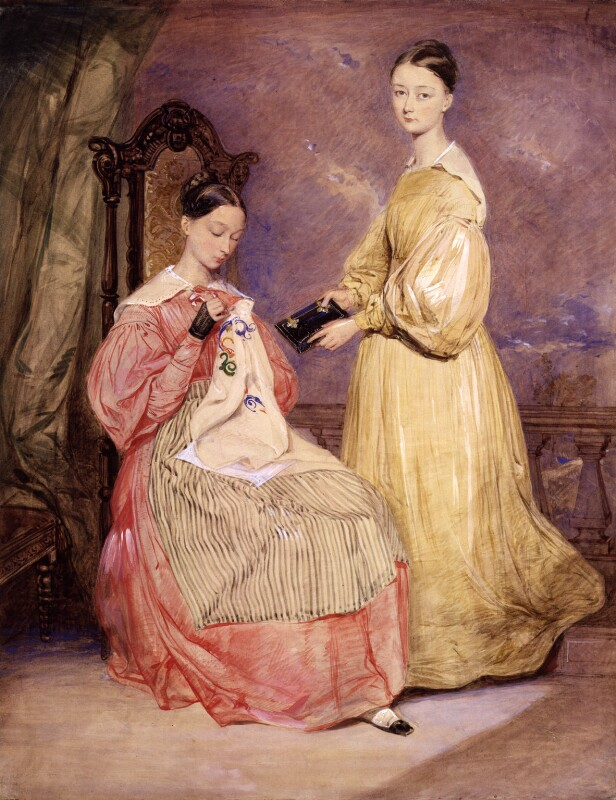
Watercolour painting of Frances Parthenope and Florence Nightingale by William White c. 1836

According to authors and historians looking into Florence's life and historians/authors looking into Parthenope, as children Parthenope and Florence were not very close and often fought. One author claims that Florence's intellectual abilities and the lack of Parthenope's created a divide between the two sisters, and often left Parthenope in the shadow of Florence. More often than not during childhood and into adulthood, "Florence would become so wrapped up in her own projects that she was unresponsive to the feelings of others, especially her older sister's." As teenagers Parthenope and Florence were said to have grown closer and even considered to be “close chums”. These teenage years were so good between Florence and Parthenope that Parthenope "savoured her teenage years ... [and] as an adult ... looked back with almost savage nostalgia on those days when she and her sister were so close."

Historians and authors have disagreed on the nature of Parthenope's feelings towards her sister, especially regarding her sisters’ uncommon and semi-revolutionary career as a nurse. In the period Parthenope had grown up in, "nurses were said to be immoral and disorderly" and "the upper classes firmly believed that hospital nursing was the choice of only the desperate and the religious", therefore it was not a profession fondly looked upon for an upper-class women to have. Authors writing on the life of Florence Nightingale and her family have claimed that Parthenope was at first opposed to her sister becoming a nurse, perhaps because of embarrassment, but maybe because of her deep attachment to her younger sister. One author claims that it is not until "we realize how close the two sisters were before 1849, how much they relied upon each other, can we understand Parthenope's extravagant grief and bitter resentment when her sister later tried to leave home."

Eventually, Florence left home and rarely returned until she fell sick after the Crimean War. In the years following Parthenope and Florence's relationship did not thrive, especially around the time of their mother's death in 1880, when it was said that, "each sister knew exactly what to do to enrage and upset the other". However, "Florence grew fonder of her sister" as she aged. Florence was an enthusiastic supporter of her sister's writing career and even went so far as to take upon herself the coordination of the care Parthenope needed towards the end of her life.

== Marriage, illness and death ==
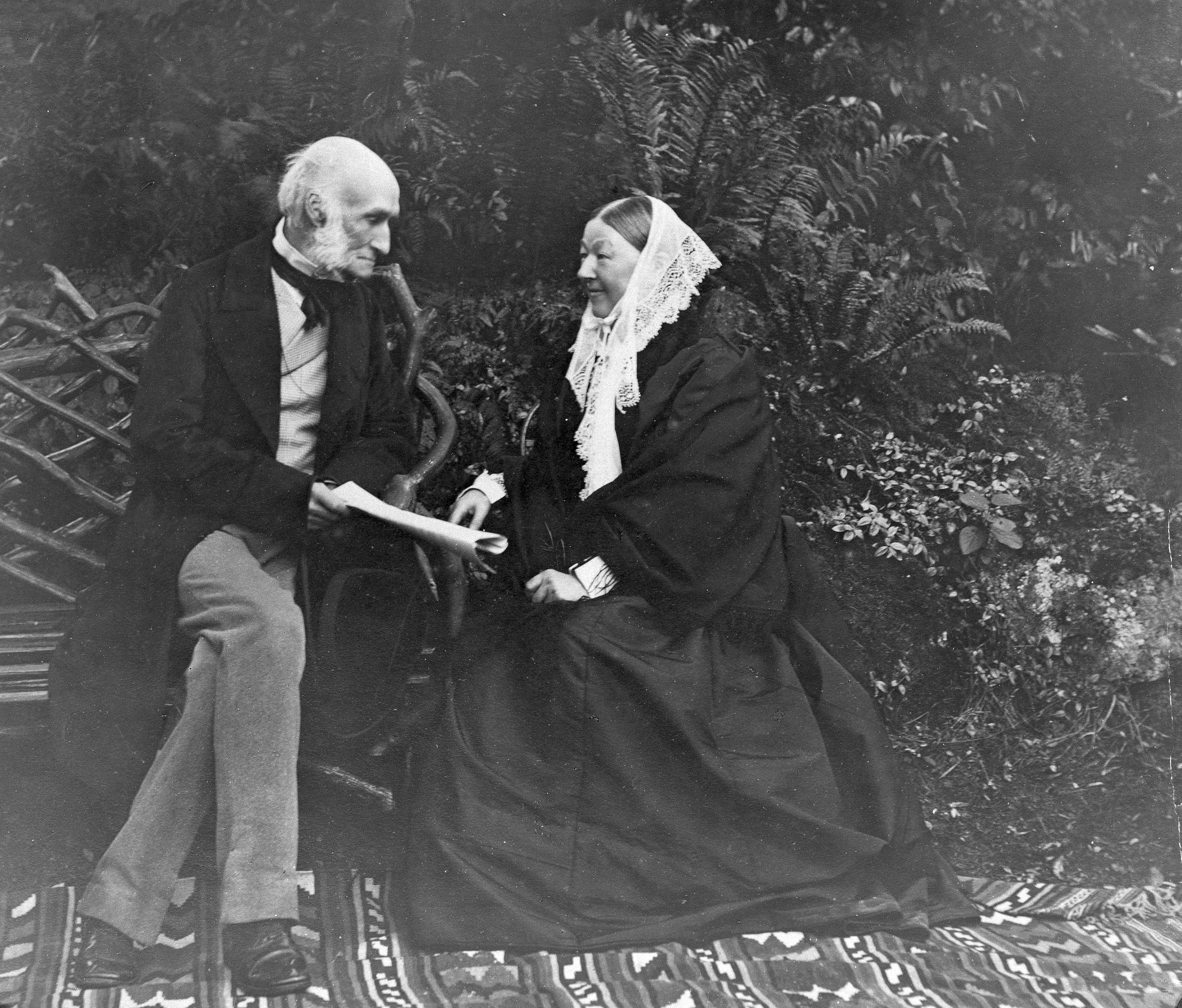
Florence Nightingale and Sir Harry Verney

On 24 June 1858, Parthenope married Harry Verney, 2nd Baronet, MP for Buckingham, a supporter of liberal causes and possessor of the family seat, Claydon House. Harry Verney had become involved with the Nightingales after his late wife's request for their daughter to meet Florence Nightingale. Verney reached out and began to form a connection with the Nightingale family for this purpose and eventually proposed marriage to Parthenope.

Although there is no evidence to support this thought, many have speculated that Verney proposed to Parthenope only after having asked and been rejected by her sister Florence. This belief however is not unwarranted as Florence and Sir Harry Verney were very close following 1861 when Florence began to depend on him as a "messenger, representative, and parliamentary liaison" after the death of another male relative who had filled these roles previously.

Parthenope was never able to carry a child to term and did not become a mother as she had "longed for" but "she rejoiced to be mother to four delightful young people", the children of Sir Harry with his late wife; Emily, Edmund, George, and Frederick.

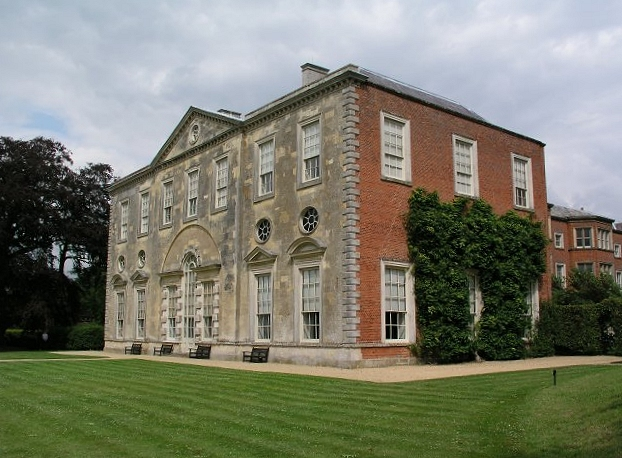
Claydon House, the estate that Sir Harry Verney and Frances Parthenope lived in after their marriage

After the marriage between Sir Harry and Parthenope, the new Lady Verney was able to develop her own talents independent of the shadow of her more famous sister; she soon turned Claydon House into a salon for interesting people, and was responsible for extensively remodelling and restoring Claydon House. She preserved and catalogued the family papers and began scholarly research into the Verney family. Parthenope was not able to finish this project because of "paralyz[ing] arthritis"; Margaret Verney completed the Memoirs of the Verney Family during the Seventeenth Century (1904).

Parthenope "was eaten by cancer and racked by coughing" at the end of her life. She had spent "years unable to sleep and relied massively on opiates to kill the pain" until she died of cancer on 12 May 1890, Florence's birthday.

Cover of Peasant Properties And Other Selected Essays by 'Lady Verney'

== Career as a writer and journalist ==
Parthenope began writing stories and articles for Fraser's Magazine, Cornhill Magazine, and Macmillan's Magazine. She published five novels; Avenhoe (1867), Stone Edge (1868), Lettice Lisle (1870), Fernyhurst Court (1871), and Llanaly Reefs (1873), and a two-volume book, Peasant Properties and Other Selected Essays. Parthenope published her early works anonymously until she became more confident to "write first 'Lady Verney' and finally 'Frances Parthenope Verney' on the title pages of her works."

Parthenope came from two families with similar but different outlooks on life that resulted in a rather progressive nature of both Parthenope and her sister Florence. The Smiths, through her mother, who had "liberal and humanitarian outlooks", and the Shores, W.E.N.'s family, as well as the Smiths who were Unitarians. Much of her writing concerned social questions of the day, and ranged from essays on "class morality" to reporting on "the Miseries of War", social differences between the poor of other nations, and religion. One of Parthenope's earlier works, Stone Edge, was "remarkably unsentimental and feminist", the book's subject and the way in which "she presents" her setting of "preindustrial Derbyshire" shows that "Verney use[d] her novel to argue that industrialization tended to free women from domestic tyranny, a radical idea for her time."
