= Sir Edmund Verney, 6th Baronet =

British landowner (1950–2026)

Sir Edmund Ralph Verney, 6th Baronet (28 June 1950 – 12 September 2026), of Claydon House, Buckinghamshire, succeeded to the family title upon his father's death in 2001.

== Background ==
The only son of Sir Ralph Verney, 5th Baronet, and Mary Vestey, granddaughter of Sir Edmund Vestey, he was educated at Harrow School before going up to the University of York, graduating BSc.

Elected a Fellow of the Royal Institution of Chartered Surveyors, he served as High Sheriff of Buckinghamshire for 1998/99.

In 1982 he married Daphne Primrose Fausset-Farquhar, daughter of Colonel Hamilton Farquhar Fausset-Farquhar.

Sir Edmund and Lady Verney had two children: Nicholas Edmund Verney (born 1983) and Ella Verney (born 1985). Sir Edmund Verney died on 12 September 2026, aged 76.

== See also ==
- Verney baronets

Honorary titles
Preceded by Denis Burrell	High Sheriff of Buckinghamshire; 1998	Succeeded by Sir William McAlpine
Baronetage of the United Kingdom
Preceded by Ralph Verney	Baronet (of Claydon House); 2001–2026	Succeeded by Nicholas Verney
