= Sir Ralph Verney, 5th Baronet =

British Army officer, local politician and landowner

Major Sir Ralph Bruce Verney, 5th Baronet, KBE, DL (18 January 1915 – 17 August 2001) was a British Army officer, local politician and landowner, who served as Chairman of the Nature Conservancy Council from 1980 to 1983.

== Early life ==
Born at Claydon House, Buckinghamshire, Verney was the son of Sir Harry Verney, 4th Baronet and Lady Rachel Catherine Bruce, the daughter of Victor Bruce, 9th Earl of Elgin. He was educated at Canford School and Balliol College, Oxford, from where he graduated in 1937. He then began his training as an accountant.

== Military career ==
Following the outbreak of the Second World War, in 1940 he was commissioned into the Royal Buckinghamshire Yeomanry. He served as an instructor at Catterick Garrison and was later deployed to India with the Berkshire Yeomanry. He saw active service in the liberation of British Malaya in 1945. He ended the war with the rank of Major.

== Conservation and public work ==
After returning from the Far East, Verney began a major restoration project on his family seat, Claydon House, which had been occupied by schools during the war. In 1957 he gifted the house and 7,000-acre estate to the National Trust, on the understanding that he and his family would always be able to live at the property. Between 1960 and 1996 Verney was Chairman of the Radcliffe Trust.

In 1980 he became Chairman of the Nature Conservancy Council, and used the NCC to promote the designation of some 4,000 locations as "sites of special scientific interest" under the Wildlife and Countryside Act 1981, often against opposition from farmers and other interested parties. Verney's unpopularity among some in the landed element of the Conservative Party led to him not being reappointed by the government when his term expired in 1983.

For 30 years Verney was a trustee of the Ernest Cook Trust. He was a member of Buckinghamshire County Council and was closely involved both in the planning of the new town of Milton Keynes and the creation of an Area of Outstanding Natural Beauty in the Chilterns. He served as High Sheriff of Buckinghamshire in 1957, was a Deputy Lieutenant for the county from 1960 to 1965, and held the office of Vice-Lord-Lieutenant of Buckinghamshire between 1965 and 1984. He was High Steward of Buckingham in 1966, and was invested as a Knight Commander of the Order of the British Empire in 1974. That same year he succeeded to his father's baronetcy.

== Personal life ==
He married Mary Vestey, daughter of Percy Charles Vestey and Dorothy Emmeline Johnston, on 7 July 1948. Together they had four children.

Baronetage of the United Kingdom
Preceded by Harry Verney	Baronet (of Claydon House); 1974–2001	Succeeded by Edmund Verney
