= Middle Claydon =

Village in Buckinghamshire, England

Coordinates: 51.9257°N 0.9539°W

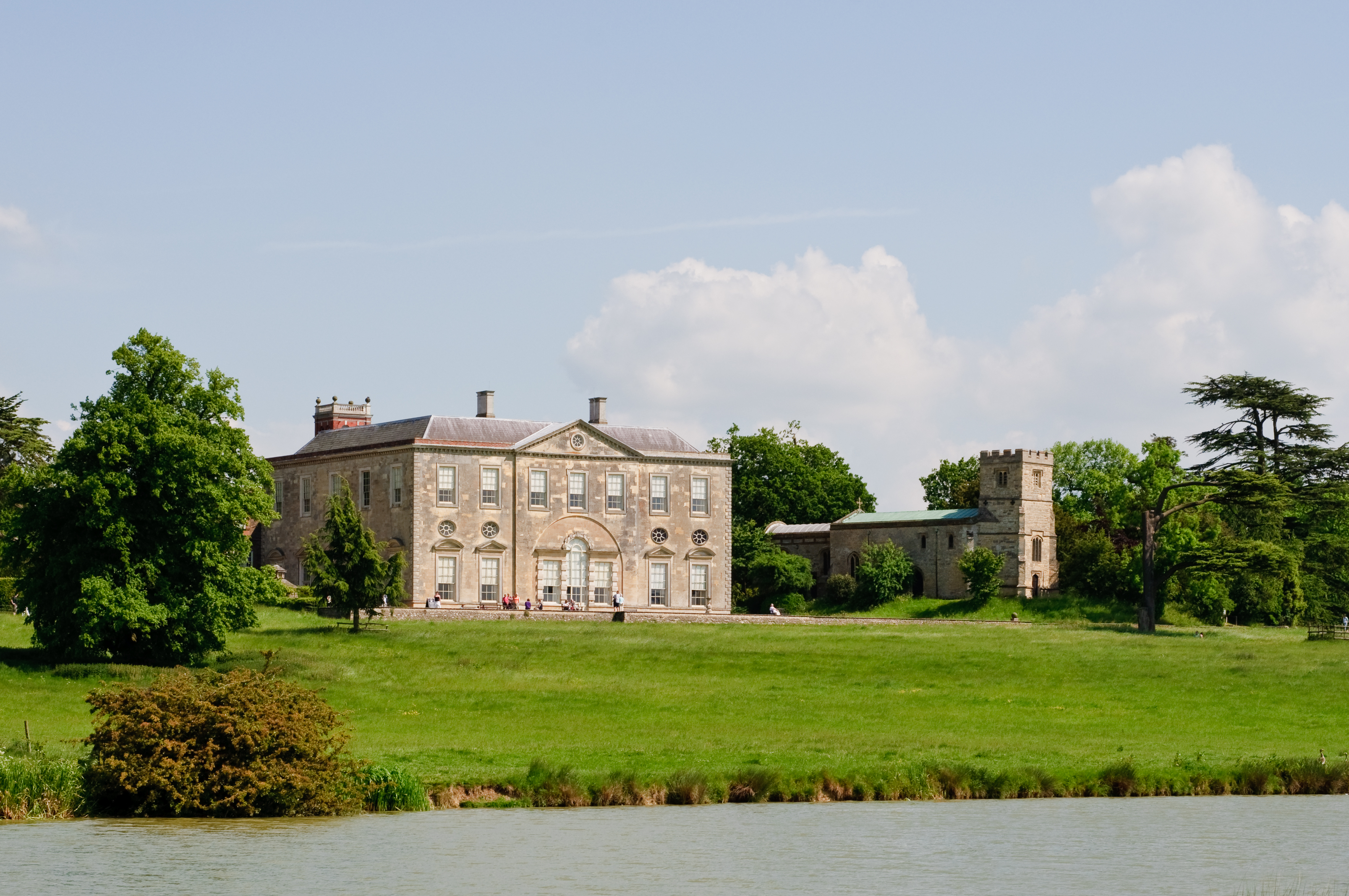
- Claydon House with All Saints, Middle Claydon, 2009

- Location within Buckinghamshire
- Population: 146 (2011 Census)
- OS grid reference: SP725255
- Civil parish: Middle Claydon
- Unitary authority: Buckinghamshire
- Ceremonial county: Buckinghamshire
- Region: South East
- Country: England
- Sovereign state: United Kingdom
- Post town: Buckingham
- Postcode district: MK18
- Dialling code: 01296
- Police: Thames Valley
- Fire: Buckinghamshire
- Ambulance: South Central
- UK Parliament: Mid Buckinghamshire
- Website: The Claydons

Middle Claydon is a village and civil parish in Buckinghamshire, England. The village is about 5 miles (8 km) south of Buckingham and about 3.5 miles (5.6 km) west of Winslow. Administratively, the parish is within the remit of Buckinghamshire Council, the unitary authority for most of the county.

The toponym "Claydon" is derived from the Old English for "clay hill". The affix "Middle" differentiates the village from nearby Steeple Claydon, and East Claydon, and from the hamlet of Botolph Claydon. The Domesday Book of 1086 records the Claydon area as Claindone.

The Church of England parish church of All Saints is in the grounds of Claydon House, a National Trust property. The house was the home of Sir Edmund Verney, an English Civil War Royalist, and of Florence Nightingale.
