= Sir Ralph Verney, 1st Baronet, of Eaton Square =

British Army officer (1879–1959)

Sir Ralph Verney 1st Baronet, of Eaton Square CB, CIE, CVO
- Born: 25 May 1879
- Died: 22 February 1959 (aged 79)
- Education: Harrow School
- Alma mater: Christ Church, Oxford
- Occupation: Soldier
- Spouse: Janette "Nita" Cheveria Hamilton Walker (m. 1909)
- Parents: Frederick Verney (father); Maude Sarah Williams (mother)
- Relatives: Sir Harry Verney (paternal grandfather); John Verney (son)
- Military career
- Allegiance: United Kingdom
- Branch: British Army
- Service years: 1900-1921
- Rank: Lieutenant-Colonel
- Unit: Rifle Brigade
- Conflicts: Second Boer War; World War I

Lieutenant-Colonel Sir Ralph Verney, 1st Baronet, CB, CIE, CVO (25 May 1879 – 22 February 1959) was a British Army officer who served as Military Secretary to the Viceroy of India and Secretary to the Speaker of the House of Commons.

== Career ==
Verney was the son of Frederick Verney (1846–1913), a Member of Parliament and younger son of Sir Harry Verney, 2nd Baronet; his mother was Maude Sarah Williams (d.1937), a daughter of Sir John Hay-Williams, 2nd Baronet. He was educated at Harrow School and Christ Church, Oxford. He joined the British Army when he was commissioned a second lieutenant in the Rifle Brigade on 7 February 1900. The following month, he was among 224 men of the regiment leaving Southampton on the SS Umbria to serve in the Second Boer War in South Africa. He later fought in World War I.

Verney was Military Secretary to the Viceroy of India from 1916 to 1921 and Secretary to the Speaker of the House of Commons from 1921 to 1955. He was knighted in 1928, and on 16 July 1946 created a Baronet, of Eaton Square in the City of Westminster, in the Baronetage of the United Kingdom.

On 11 November 1909 he married Janette "Nita" Cheveria Hamilton Walker, the daughter of Senator James Thomas Walker. He was succeeded by his son John Verney, 2nd Baronet, of Eaton Square.
