= Sir Edmund Verney, 3rd Baronet =

British RN officer & politician (1838-1910)

Sir Edmund Hope Verney FRGS, DL, JP

Member of Parliament for Buckingham
- In office 1885–1886
- Preceded by: Sir Harry Verney
- Succeeded by: Egerton Hubbard

Member of Parliament for Buckingham
- In office 1889–1891
- Preceded by: Egerton Hubbard
- Succeeded by: Herbert Leon

Personal details
- Born: 6 April 1838
- Died: 8 May 1910 (aged 72)
- Party: Liberal
- Spouse: Margaret Maria Williams (m. 1868)
- Children: 4
- Parents: Sir Harry Verney (father); Eliza Hope (mother)
- Relatives: Admiral Sir George Johnstone Hope (maternal grandfather); Harry Verney (son)
- Education: Windlesham House School
- Military career
- Allegiance: United Kingdom
- Branch: Royal Navy
- Service years: 1851-1884
- Rank: Captain
- Units: HMS Grappler; HMS Oberon; HMS Growler
- Conflicts: Crimean War; Indian Mutiny
- Awards: Crimea Medal; Turkish Crimean War medal Indian Mutiny Medal; Mentioned in despatches

Sir Edmund Hope Verney, 3rd Baronet FRGS, DL, JP (6 April 1838 – 8 May 1910) was a British naval officer, author and Liberal politician who sat in the House of Commons in two periods between 1885 and 1891.

== Background and education ==
Verney was the eldest son of Sir Harry Verney, 2nd Baronet, and his first wife Eliza Hope, daughter of Admiral Sir George Johnstone Hope. Verney was educated at Windlesham House School and Harrow School and entered the Royal Navy in 1851. He succeeded his father as baronet in 1894.

== Career ==
Verney served in the Crimean War between 1854 and 1855 being afterwards honoured with the Crimea Medal and its Sebastopol clasp and the Turkish Crimean War medal. Following his service during the Indian Mutiny between 1857 and 1858, where he was mentioned in despatches and received the Indian Mutiny Medal with the Lucknow clasp, he was promoted to lieutenant. From 1862, he commanded HMS Grappler and in 1866 he was transferred as a commander to HMS Oberon. Verney was on board HMS Growler from 1870 and in 1875 he was attached to Her Majesty's Coastguard, division Liverpool until 1877, when he was promoted to captain. He retired seven years later.

Verney contested unsuccessfully Great Marlow in 1868, Anglesey in 1874 and Portsmouth in 1880. He entered the House of Commons in 1885, sitting as a Member of Parliament (MP) for Buckingham until the following year. He represented the constituency again from 1889 until 1891, when he was expelled after being sentenced to one year of imprisonment after being convicted of procuring a girl under 21 years of age for immoral purposes.

Verney was a member of the Isle of Anglesey County Council as well as the London County Council and in 1887 was appointed chairman of the Quarter Sessions, Anglesey, a post he held for the next three years. He was a Fellow of the Royal Geographical Society and was a justice of the peace and deputy lieutenant for Anglesey and Buckinghamshire.

Verney was a supporter of the Irish Home Rule movement and subscribed to the idea of a Celtic identity, referring to the Irish as the "Celtic brethren" of the Welsh.

== Family ==
On 14 January 1868, he married Margaret Maria Williams, daughter of Sir John Hay Williams, 2nd Baronet and had by her three daughters and a son. Verney died in 1910 and was succeeded in baronetcy by his son Harry. In June 1858, Verney's father married Frances Parthenope Nightingale after the death of his first wife. She was the sister of Florence Nightingale, who became Aunt Florence to Verney's children.

== Works ==
- The Shannon's Brigade in India; (1862)
- The Last Four Days of the Eurydice; (1878)
- Village Sketches; (1879)
- Four Years of Protest in the Transvaal; (1881)
- The Parish Charities of North Buckinghamshire; (1887 and 1905)
- War With Crime; (1889)

Parliament of the United Kingdom
Preceded by Sir Harry Verney	Member of Parliament for Buckingham; 1885 – 1886	Succeeded by Egerton Hubbard
Preceded by Egerton Hubbard	Member of Parliament for Buckingham; 1889 – 1891	Succeeded by Herbert Leon
Baronetage of the United Kingdom
Preceded by Harry Verney	Baronet (of Claydon House); 1894 – 1910	Succeeded by Harry Verney
