= Verney baronets =

Set index for Verney baronets

There have been three baronetcies held by persons with the surname Verney, one in the Baronetage of England and two in the Baronetage of the United Kingdom. Two of the creations are extant as of 2026.

- Verney baronets of Middle Claydon (1661): see Earl Verney
- Verney baronets of Claydon House (1818), initially Calvert baronets
- Verney baronets of Eaton Square (1946)
