= Buckingham by-election =

Buckingham by-election may refer to one several parliamentary by-elections held in England for the House of Commons constituency of Buckingham:

- 1889 Buckingham by-election
- 1891 Buckingham by-election
- 1937 Buckingham by-election
- 1943 Buckingham by-election

== See also ==
- Buckingham (UK Parliament constituency)
