= Sir William Smyth, 1st Baronet =

English politician

Sir William Smyth, 1st Baronet (c. 1616 – 1696) was an English politician who sat in the House of Commons at various times between 1640 and 1679. He supported the Royalist cause in the English Civil War.

Smyth was the son of Robert Smyth of Buckingham and Akeley, Buckinghamshire and his wife Martha. He matriculated at Trinity College, Oxford, on 13 March 1635 aged 18, but left without taking a degree. He was called to the bar at Middle Temple in 1641.

In 1641, he was elected Member of Parliament for Winchelsea in the Long Parliament. He supported the King in the Civil War and was governor of Chepstow Castle. He was created DCL at Oxford on 10 November 1642. He was disabled from sitting in Parliament on 16 January 1644. His father was killed at Oxford in 1645 during the war.

After the Restoration of the Monarchy, Smyth was created baronet of Redcliff, Buckinghamshire on 10 May 1661. In 1661 he was elected MP for Buckingham in the Cavalier Parliament.

Smyth died at Stepney at the age of about 80 and requested in his will to be buried at Akeley. He had married firstly Margaret Denton, daughter of Sir Alexander Denton of Hillesden and married secondly a daughter of Sir Nathaniel Hobart. His only surviving son Thomas succeeded to the baronetcy.

Parliament of England
Preceded by Nicholas Crisp; John Finch	Member of Parliament for Winchelsea; 1640–1644; With: John Finch 1640–1642	Succeeded by Henry Oxenden; Samuel Gott
Preceded by John Dormer; Sir Richard Temple, 3rd Baronet	Member of Parliament for Buckingham; 1661–1679; With: Sir Richard Temple, 3rd Baronet	Succeeded by Viscount Latimer; Sir Peter Tyrrell, 1st Baronet
Baronetage of England
New creation	Baronet (of Redcliff); 1661–1696	Succeeded by Thomas Smyth
