= Edward Lloyd =

Edward Lloyd may refer to:

== Politicians ==
- Edward Lloyd (MP for Montgomery), Welsh lawyer and politician
- Edward Lloyd (16th-century MP) (died 1547) for Buckingham
- Edward Lloyd, 1st Baron Mostyn (1768–1854), British politician
- Edward Lloyd II (1670–1718), Governor of the Maryland Colony, 1709–1714
- Edward Lloyd IV (1744–1796), his grandson, Maryland delegate to the Continental Congress
- Edward Lloyd (Governor of Maryland) (1779–1834), his son, U.S. Congressman and Senator, and Governor of Maryland, 1809–1811
- Edward Lloyd (1798–1861), his son, President of the Maryland State Senate, 1852–53
- Edward Lloyd (1825–1907), his son, President of the Maryland State Senate 1878 and 1892
- Edward Henry Lloyd (1825–1889), Australian politician from New South Wales

== Others ==
- Edward Lhuyd (1660–1709), Welsh naturalist, botanist, linguist, geographer and antiquary
- Edward Floyd or Lloyd (died 1648), impeached English man
- Edward Lloyd (coffee house owner), ran Lloyd's Coffee House in London, a meeting place for shipowners that spawned Lloyd's of London, Lloyd's Register, and Lloyd's List
- Sir Edward Pryce Lloyd, 1st Baronet (c. 1710–1795), whose son was created Baron Mostyn in 1831
- Edward Lloyd (publisher) (1815–1890), British owner of the Daily Chronicle and Lloyd's Weekly Newspaper
- Edward Lloyd (tenor) (1845–1927), British oratorio singer
- Edward Lloyd (cricketer) (1845–1928), English schoolmaster and cricketer

== See also ==
- John Edward Lloyd (1861–1947), Welsh historian
- Edward Lloyd Jones (1874–1934), Australian cattle breeder and chairman of David Jones department store
