= Buckingham (constituency) =

Former Parliamentary constituency in the United Kingdom from 1542 to 2024

Coordinates: 52.000°N 0.988°W

- Former county constituency for the House of Commons
- Boundary of Buckingham in Buckinghamshire

- Location of Buckinghamshire within England
- County: Buckinghamshire
- Population: 97,184 (2011 census)
- Electorate: 79,515 (2018)
- Major settlements: Buckingham; Princes Risborough; Winslow

1885–2024
- Seats: One
- Replaced by: Mid Buckinghamshire, Buckingham and Bletchley and Aylesbury (Part)
- During its existence contributed to new seat(s) of: Milton Keynes (1983), Milton Keynes South West (1992)

Buckingham
- Former borough constituency for the House of Commons
- County: Buckinghamshire

1542–1885
- Seats: Two until 1868, then one until 1885

Buckingham (/ˈbʌkɪŋəm/) was a constituency (Note: A county constituency (for the purposes of election expenses and type of returning officer).) that existed from 1542 to 2024 and was last represented in the House of Commons of the UK Parliament by Greg Smith, a Conservative. (Note: As with all current constituencies, the constituency elected one Member of Parliament (MP) by the first past the post system of election at least every five years.)

The seat was abolished for the 2024 general election and largely replaced by the new constituencies Buckingham and Bletchley and Mid Buckinghamshire, with some areas transferred to Aylesbury.

== History ==
After its creation in 1542, the Parliamentary Borough of Buckingham sent two MPs to the House of Commons of England until 1707, then to the House of Commons of Great Britain from 1707 to 1800 and finally to the House of Commons of the United Kingdom from 1801, reduced to one MP from 1868 by the Representation of the People Act 1867. The Borough was abolished altogether by the Redistribution of Seats Act 1885, and it was transformed into a large county division, formally named the North or Buckingham Division of Buckinghamshire. It was one of three divisions formed from the undivided three-member Parliamentary County of Buckinghamshire, the other two being the Mid or Aylesbury Division and the Southern or Wycombe Division.

In the twentieth century, the constituency was held by the Conservative Party for most of the time. However, Aidan Crawley, a Labour Party MP, served Buckingham from 1945 until 1951, and from 1964 until 1970, its Labour MP was the controversial publisher Robert Maxwell.

Before the periodic review effected in 1983, the new town of Milton Keynes, including its older parts such as Bletchley and Fenny Stratford, (Note: The development of Milton Keynes commenced in 1967.) was in the constituency. The 1983 review followed the previous national review in 1974 and recognised the large increase in voters in the constituency. The sitting Buckingham MP, William Benyon, stood for the newly created Milton Keynes constituency, where he was elected. The residual seat was won in 1983 by Conservative George Walden. Walden retired in 1997, and John Bercow won the following general elections in 2001, 2005, 2010, 2015 and 2017. At the 2005 general election, this constituency had the Conservatives' highest numerical majority, although a higher share of the vote was achieved in Kensington and Chelsea in London, the constituency of Malcolm Rifkind, and Richmond in North Yorkshire, the constituency of William Hague.

In 2009, Bercow was elected as Speaker of the House of Commons following the resignation of Michael Martin. There is an inconsistently followed convention, which is mostly kept by the major parties, not to oppose a Speaker at election. Nonetheless, UKIP's leader, Nigel Farage, stood against Bercow in the 2010 election but finished third behind the Buckinghamshire Campaign for Democracy founder, who previously founded the Pro-Euro Conservative Party.

In both the 2015 and 2017 general elections, Bercow was challenged by only UKIP and the Green Party, with the addition of the independent candidate Scott Raven in the latter election. In September 2019 the Conservative Party announced their intention to stand a candidate against Bercow in the next election, breaking the convention of major parties not opposing a Speaker, seemingly in response to Bercow's opposition to Prime Minister Boris Johnson's handling of Brexit. However, Bercow announced in September 2019 that he would stand down as Speaker on either October 31 or at the next election, whichever occurred first.

== Boundaries and boundary changes ==
=== 1885–1918 ===
- The Municipal Borough of Buckingham;
- The Sessional Divisions of Ashendon, Buckingham, Newport, and Stony Stratford; and
- Part of the Sessional Division of Winslow.

=== 1918–1950 ===
- The Municipal Borough of Buckingham;
- The Urban Districts of Bletchley, Linslade, and Newport Pagnell;
- The Rural Districts of Buckingham, Newport Pagnell, Stratford and Wolverton, Wing, and Winslow; and
- Parts of the Rural Districts of Aylesbury and Long Crendon.

Gained Linslade and the Rural District of Wing from Aylesbury.

=== 1950–1974 ===
- The Municipal Borough of Buckingham;
- The Urban Districts of Bletchley, Linslade, Newport Pagnell, and Wolverton; and
- The Rural Districts of Buckingham, Newport Pagnell, Wing, and Winslow.

The Urban District of Wolverton had succeeded the Rural District of Stratford and Wolverton. The parts of the Rural District of Aylesbury and the (former) Rural District of Long Crendon were transferred to Aylesbury.

=== 1974–1983 ===
- The Municipal Borough of Buckingham;
- The Urban Districts of Bletchley, Newport Pagnell, and Wolverton; and
- The Rural Districts of Buckingham, Newport Pagnell, Wing, and Winslow.

Lost Linslade to South Bedfordshire; the Urban District of Linslade had been merged with that of Leighton Buzzard to form the Urban District of Leighton-Linslade, which was included in the Administrative County of Bedfordshire.

=== 1983–1992 ===
- The District of Aylesbury Vale wards of Bierton, Brill, Buckingham North, Buckingham South, Cheddington, Eddlesborough, Great Brickhill, Great Horwood, Grendon Underwood, Haddenham, Hogshaw, Long Crendon, Luffield Abbey, Marsh Gibbon, Newton Longville, Oakley, Pitstone, Quainton, Steeple Claydon, Stewkley, Stone, Tingewick, Waddesdon, Wing, Wingrave, and Winslow; and
- The Borough of Milton Keynes wards of Stony Stratford, Wolverton, and Wolverton Stacey Bushes.

Rural areas to the north and west of the town of Aylesbury transferred from the constituency thereof. The area comprising the new District of Milton Keynes, except for Stony Stratford and Wolverton, formed the new constituency of Milton Keynes.

=== 1992–1997 ===
For the 1992 general election, outside the normal cycle of periodic reviews by the Boundaries Commission, the Milton Keynes constituency was split in two, with Stony Stratford and Wolverton being included in the new Borough Constituency of Milton Keynes South West. No further changes.

=== 1997–2010 ===
The District of Aylesbury Vale wards of Aston Clinton, Bierton, Brill, Buckingham North, Buckingham South, Cheddington, Eddlesborough, Great Brickhill, Great Horwood, Grendon Underwood, Haddenham, Hogshaw, Long Crendon, Luffield Abbey, Marsh Gibbon, Newton Longville, Oakley, Pitstone, Quainton, Steeple Claydon, Stewkley, Stone, Tingewick, Waddesdon, Wing, Wingrave, and Winslow.

The Aston Clinton ward was transferred from Aylesbury.

=== 2010–2024 ===
Map of boundaries 2010–2024

- The District of Aylesbury Vale wards of Buckingham North, Buckingham South, Eddlesborough, Gatehouse, Great Brickhill & Newton Longville, Great Horwood, Grendon Underwood & Brill, Haddenham & Stone, Long Crendon, Luffield Abbey, Marsh Gibbon, Oakfield & Bierton, Oakley, Pitstone & Cheddington, Quainton, Steeple Claydon, Stewkley, Tingewick, Waddesdon, Watermead, Weedon, Wing, Wingrave, and Winslow; and
- The District of Wycombe wards of Icknield and The Risboroughs.

The District of Wycombe wards, including Princes Risborough, were transferred from Aylesbury, offset by the return of Aston Clinton.

In April 2020, the Districts of Aylesbury Vale and Wycombe, as well as those of South Bucks and Chiltern were merged into the new unitary authority of Buckinghamshire Council. Accordingly, the contents of the constituency were:

- The Buckinghamshire Council wards of Aston Clinton and Bierton (part), Bernwood, Buckingham East, Buckingham West, Great Brickhill, Grendon Underwood, Ivinghoe, Ridgeway East (part), Stone and Waddesdon (part), The Risboroughs, Wing (part), and Winslow.

The constituency covered a large part of central Buckinghamshire, covering much of the Aylesbury Vale including the town of Buckingham, and some areas south of it, including Chequers, the official country residence of the Prime Minister since 1921. To the north, the remaining part of ceremonial Buckinghamshire forms two Borough of Milton Keynes constituencies (Milton Keynes South and Milton Keynes North).

== Abolition ==
Further to the completion of the 2023 review of Westminster constituencies, the seat was abolished for the 2024 general election, with its contents distributed three ways:

- Buckingham, Winslow, Great Brickhill and surrounding rural areas form part of the newly created constituency of Buckingham and Bletchley, with the Bletchley area of the City of Milton Keynes
- Western areas, extending southwards to Haddenham and Princes Risborough, form part of the new constituency of Mid Buckinghamshire.
- Wing and Ivinghoe wards were transferred to Aylesbury.

== Members of Parliament ==
- Constituency created (1542)

=== MPs to 1660 ===
Year	First member	Second member
1529	John Hasilwood	Edward Lloyd
1536	Thomas Pope	George Gifford
1539		
1542		
1545	John Josselyn	Ralph Gifford
1547	Henry Carey, 1st Baron Hunsdon	John Josselyn
1553 (Mar)	Edward Chamberlain	Francis Verney
1553 (Oct)	William Walter	Edward Gifford
1554 (Apr)	Henry Carey, 1st Baron Hunsdon	George Fettiplace
1554 (Nov)	Henry Carey, 1st Baron Hunsdon	George Fettiplace
1555	Henry Carey, 1st Baron Hunsdon	Hugh Mynors
1558	Bernard Brocas	John Higford
1558–59	Robert Drury	William Riseley
1562–63	Robert Newdigate I	Paul Wentworth
1571	Robert Newdigate I	Thomas Wenman
1572	Henry Carey	Lawrence Holinshed
1584	Michael Harcourt	John Carey, 3rd Baron Hunsdon
1586	John Fortescue	Christopher Edmonds
1588–89	John Carey, 3rd Baron Hunsdon	Francis Fortescue
1593	John Carey, 3rd Baron Hunsdon	Francis Fortescue
1597	Sir Edward [or Edmund] Carey	Francis Fortescue
1601	Christopher Hatton	Robert Newdigate II
1604	Sir Thomas Denton	Sir Edward Tyrrell (1604–1606)
1604	Sir Thomas Denton	Sir Francis Goodwin (1606–1614)
1614	Sir Thomas Denton	Sir Ralph Winwood
1621–22	Sir Thomas Denton	Richard Oliver
1624	Sir Edmund Verney	Richard Oliver
1625	Sir Alexander Denton	Richard Oliver
1626	Sir Alexander Denton	Sir John Smythe
1628–29	Sir Thomas Denton	Richard Oliver

Year	First member	Second member
Apr 1640	Sir Peter Temple	Sir Alexander Denton
Nov 1640	Sir Peter Temple	Sir Alexander Denton
1645	Sir Peter Temple	John Dormer
1653	Buckingham not Represented in Barebones Parliament	
1654	Francis Ingoldsby	(one seat only)
1656	Francis Ingoldsby	(one seat only)
1659	Francis Ingoldsby	Sir Richard Temple, 3rd Baronet

=== MPs 1660–1868 ===
Year	First member	First party	Second member	Second party
1660	John Dormer		Sir Richard Temple, 3rd Baronet	
1661	Sir William Smyth, 1st Baronet		Sir Richard Temple, 3rd Baronet	
February 1679	Viscount Latimer		Sir Peter Tyrrell, 1st Baronet	
August 1679	Viscount Latimer		Sir Richard Temple, 3rd Bt.	
1681	Sir Ralph Verney, 1st Bt.		Sir Richard Temple, 3rd Bt.	
1690	Alexander Denton		Sir Richard Temple, 3rd Bt.	
1697	Alexander Denton		Sir Richard Temple, 4th Bt.	Whig
1698	Edmund Denton		Sir Richard Temple, 4th Bt.	Whig
1702	Edmund Denton		Roger Price	
May 1705	Edmund Denton		Sir Richard Temple, 4th Bt.	Whig
December 1705	Edmund Denton		Browne Willis	
1708	Sir Richard Temple, 4th Bt.	Whig	Alexander Denton	
1710	Sir Richard Temple, 4th Bt.	Whig	Thomas Chapman	
1713	John Radcliffe		Thomas Chapman	
1715	Alexander Denton		Abraham Stanyan	
1718	Alexander Denton		Edmund Halsey	
March 1722	Alexander Denton		Richard Grenville	
October 1722	William Heathcote		Richard Grenville	
March 1727	William Heathcote		John Fane	
August 1727	Thomas Lewis		John Fane	
1728	George Chamberlayne		John Fane	
1734	George Chamberlayne		Richard Grenville	
1741	George Chamberlayne		George Grenville	Whig
1747	Richard Grenville		George Grenville	Whig
1753	Temple West		George Grenville	Whig
1754	James Grenville		George Grenville	Whig
1768	Henry Grenville		George Grenville	Whig
1770	Henry Grenville		James Grenville	Tory
1774	Richard Grenville		James Grenville	Tory
1780	Richard Aldworth-Neville		James Grenville	Tory
1782	William Grenville	Tory	James Grenville	Tory
1784	Charles Edmund Nugent	Tory	James Grenville	Tory
June 1790	George Nugent	Tory	James Grenville	Tory
December 1790	George Nugent	Tory	The Lord Bridport	Tory
1796	George Nugent	Tory	Thomas Grenville	Tory
1802	Lord Proby	Tory	Thomas Grenville	Tory
1805	Lord Proby	Tory	Thomas Grenville	Tory
August 1806	Earl Percy	Tory	Thomas Grenville	Tory
November 1806	Sir William Young, 2nd Bt.	Tory	Thomas Grenville	Tory
March 1807	Sir John Borlase Warren, 1st Bt.		Thomas Grenville	Tory
May 1807	Hon. Richard Griffin	Tory	Thomas Grenville	Tory
1810	Hon. Richard Griffin	Tory	Lord George Grenville	Tory
1812	Viscount Ebrington	Tory	William Fremantle	Tory
1817	James Hamilton Stanhope	Tory	William Fremantle	Tory
1818	Sir George Nugent, 1st Bt.	Tory	William Fremantle	Tory
1827	Sir George Nugent, 1st Bt.	Tory	Sir Thomas Fremantle, 1st Bt.	Tory
1832	Sir Harry Verney	Whig	Sir Thomas Fremantle, 1st Bt.	Tory
1834	Sir Harry Verney	Whig	Sir Thomas Fremantle, 1st Bt.	Conservative
1841	Sir John Chetwode, 4th Bt.	Conservative	Sir Thomas Fremantle, 1st Bt.	Conservative
January 1846	John Hall	Conservative	Sir Thomas Fremantle, 1st Bt.	Conservative
February 1846	John Hall	Conservative	Marquess of Chandos	Conservative
1857	John Hall	Conservative	Sir Harry Verney	Whig
1859	John Hubbard	Conservative	Sir Harry Verney	Liberal
1868	Representation reduced to one member			

=== MPs since 1868 ===
Election	Member	Party	Notes
1868	Sir Harry Verney	Liberal	
1874	Egerton Hubbard	Conservative	
1880	Sir Harry Verney	Liberal	
1885	Edmund Verney	Liberal	
1886	Egerton Hubbard	Conservative	Succeeded to title of Baron Addington
1889 by-election	Edmund Verney	Liberal	Expelled after being sentenced to one year of imprisonment
1891 by-election	Herbert Leon	Liberal	
1895	William Carlile	Conservative	
1906	Frederick Verney	Liberal	
Dec 1910	Harry Verney	Liberal	
1918	George Bowyer	Conservative	Comptroller of the Household (1935); Raised to the peerage as Baron Denham
1937 by-election	John Whiteley	Conservative	Died July 1943
1943 by-election	Lionel Berry	Conservative	
1945	Aidan Crawley (Note: Later served as a Conservative MP)	Labour	
1951	Frank Markham (Note: Formerly served as a Labour MP)	Conservative	Member for Nottingham South (1935–1945)
1964	Robert Maxwell	Labour	
1970	Bill Benyon	Conservative	Contested Milton Keynes following redistribution
Constituency split, majority renamed Milton Keynes, minority merged with part of Aylesbury
1983	George Walden	Conservative	
1997	John Bercow	Conservative	Shadow Secretary of State for International Development (2003–2004)
2009	John Bercow	Speaker	Speaker of the House (2009–2019)
2019	Greg Smith	Conservative	Contested Mid Buckinghamshire following redistribution
2024	Constituency abolished: see Mid Buckinghamshire		

== Election results 1983–2024 ==
2010s – 2000s – 1990s – 1980s – 1970s – 1960s – 1950s – 1940s – 1930s – 1920s – 1910s – 1900s – 1890s – 1880s – 1870s – 1860s – 1850s – 1840s – 1830s

=== Elections in the 2010s ===
General election 2019: Buckingham
Party	Candidate	Votes	%	±%
Conservative	Greg Smith	37,035	58.4	N/A
Liberal Democrats	Stephen Dorrell	16,624	26.2	New
Labour	David Morgan	7,638	12.0	New
Brexit Party	Andrew Bell	1,286	2.0	New
Independent	Ned Thompson	681	1.1	New
English Democrat	Antonio Vitiello	194	0.3	New
Majority		20,411	32.2	N/A
Turnout		63,458	76.3	+10.1
Registered electors				
Conservative gain from Speaker		Swing		

General election 2017: Buckingham
Party	Candidate	Votes	%	±%
Speaker	John Bercow (Note: John Bercow stood as 'The Speaker seeking re-election'.)	34,299	65.1	+0.6
Green	Michael John Sheppard	8,574	16.3	+2.6
Independent	Scott Darren Raven	5,638	10.7	New
UKIP	Brian James Mapletoft	4,168	7.9	−13.8
Majority		25,725	48.8	+6.0
Turnout		52,679	66.2	−3.1
Registered electors				
Speaker hold		Swing		

General election 2015: Buckingham
Party	Candidate	Votes	%	±%
Speaker	John Bercow	34,617	64.5	+17.2
UKIP	Dave Fowler	11,675	21.7	+4.3
Green	Alan Francis	7,400	13.7	New
Majority		22,942	42.8	+16.9
Turnout		53,692	69.3	+4.8
Registered electors				
Speaker hold		Swing	+6.4	

General election 2010: Buckingham
Party	Candidate	Votes	%	±%
Speaker	John Bercow	22,860	47.3	−10.9
Buckinghamshire Campaign for Democracy	John Stevens	10,331	21.4	New
UKIP	Nigel Farage	8,410	17.4	+13.9
Independent	Patrick Phillips	2,394	5.0	New
Independent	Debbie Martin	1,270	2.6	New
BNP	Lynne Mozar	980	2.0	New
Monster Raving Loony	Colin Dale	856	1.8	New
Independent	Geoff Howard	435	0.9	New
Christian	David Hews	369	0.8	New
Independent	Anthony Watts	332	0.7	New
Cut The Deficit	Simon Strutt	107	0.2	New
Majority		12,529	25.9	–11.9
Turnout		48,344	64.5	−3.8
Registered electors		74,996		+2,501
Speaker hold		Swing	–6.0	

2005 notional result
Party	Vote	%
Conservative	28,781	58.2
Labour	10,065	20.3
Liberal Democrats	8,922	18.0
UKIP	1,705	3.4
Turnout	49,473	68.2
Electorate	72,495	

=== Elections in the 2000s ===
General election 2005: Buckingham
Party	Candidate	Votes	%	±%
Conservative	John Bercow	27,748	57.4	+3.8
Labour	David Greene	9,619	19.9	−4.3
Liberal Democrats	Luke Croydon	9,508	19.7	−0.3
UKIP	David Williams	1,432	3.0	+0.9
Majority		18,129	37.5	+8.1
Turnout		48,307	68.7	−0.7
Registered electors				
Conservative hold		Swing	+4.0	

General election 2001: Buckingham
Party	Candidate	Votes	%	±%
Conservative	John Bercow	24,296	53.6	+3.8
Labour	Mark Seddon	10,971	24.2	−0.5
Liberal Democrats	Isobel Wilson	9,037	20.0	−4.6
UKIP	Christopher Silcock	968	2.1	New
Majority		13,325	29.4	+4.3
Turnout		45,272	69.4	−9.1
Registered electors				
Conservative hold		Swing	+2.2	

=== Elections in the 1990s ===
General election 1997: Buckingham
Party	Candidate	Votes	%	±%
Conservative	John Bercow	24,594	49.8	–12.5
Labour	Robert C. Lehmann	12,208	24.7	+8.7
Liberal Democrats	Neil Stuart	12,175	24.6	+3.8
Natural Law	Geoffrey Clements	421	0.9	+0.1
Majority		12,386	25.1	–16.4
Turnout		49,398	78.5	–5.2
Registered electors		62,945		+3,410
Conservative hold		Swing	–10.6	

1992 notional result
Party	Vote	%
Conservative	31,045	62.3
Liberal Democrats	10,401	20.9
Labour	7,999	16.1
Others	391	0.8
Turnout	49,836	
Electorate	59,535	

General election 1992: Buckingham
Party	Candidate	Votes	%	±%
Conservative	George Walden	29,496	62.5	+3.9
Liberal Democrats	Tudor Jones	9,705	20.6	−4.3
Labour	Keith M. White	7,662	16.2	−0.3
Natural Law	Lawrence R. Sheaff	353	0.7	New
Majority		19,791	41.9	+8.2
Turnout		47,216	84.2	+5.9
Registered electors				
Conservative hold		Swing	+4.1	

=== Elections in the 1980s ===
General election 1987: Buckingham
Party	Candidate	Votes	%	±%
Conservative	George Walden	32,162	58.6	+1.7
Liberal	Charles Burke	13,636	24.9	−3.2
Labour	Martyn Groucutt	9,053	16.5	+1.5
Majority		18,526	33.7	+4.9
Turnout		54,851	78.3	+1.2
Registered electors				
Conservative hold		Swing	+2.5	

General election 1983: Buckingham
Party	Candidate	Votes	%	±%
Conservative	George Walden	27,522	56.9	+0.5
Liberal	Richard Ryder	13,584	28.1	+13.5
Labour	Martyn Groucutt	7,272	15.0	–13.3
Majority		13,938	28.8	+0.8
Turnout		48,378	77.1	
Registered electors		62,758		
Conservative hold		Swing	–6.5	

1979 notional result
Party	Vote	%
Conservative	27,393	56.4
Labour	13,759	28.3
Liberal	7,109	14.6
Others	346	0.7
Turnout	48,607	
Electorate		

== Election results 1885–1983 ==
=== Elections in the 1970s ===
General election 1979: Buckingham
Party	Candidate	Votes	%	±%
Conservative	Bill Benyon	41,719	51.3	+9.1
Labour	J.S. Fryer	27,752	34.1	−3.5
Liberal	S.B. Crooks	11,045	13.6	−6.6
National Front	M. Smith	803	1.0	New
Majority		13,967	17.2	+12.6
Turnout		81,319	78.6	–1.1
Registered electors				
Conservative hold		Swing	+6.3	

General election October 1974: Buckingham
Party	Candidate	Votes	%	±%
Conservative	Bill Benyon	26,597	42.2	+1.5
Labour	Robert Maxwell	23,679	37.6	+1.6
Liberal	S.B. Crooks	12,707	20.2	−3.1
Majority		2,918	4.6	–0.1
Turnout		62,983	79.7	–5.6
Registered electors				
Conservative hold		Swing	−0.1	

General election February 1974: Buckingham
Party	Candidate	Votes	%	±%
Conservative	Bill Benyon	27,179	40.7	−6.9
Labour	Robert Maxwell	24,056	36.0	−7.0
Liberal	C. Crooks	15,519	23.3	+13.9
Majority		3,123	4.7	+0.1
Turnout		66,754	85.3	+3.4
Registered electors		78,268		+8,811
Conservative hold		Swing	+0.1	

1970 notional result
Party	Vote	%
Conservative	27,100	47.6
Labour	24,500	43.1
Liberal	5,300	9.3
Turnout	59,600	81.9
Electorate	69,457	

General election 1970: Buckingham
Party	Candidate	Votes	%	±%
Conservative	Bill Benyon	28,088	47.5	+4.3
Labour	Robert Maxwell	25,567	43.2	−4.3
Liberal	John Martin Cornwall	5,475	9.3	−0.1
Majority		2,521	4.3	N/A
Turnout		59,130	81.8	−4.0
Conservative gain from Labour		Swing	+4.3	

=== Elections in the 1960s ===
General election 1966: Buckingham
Party	Candidate	Votes	%	±%
Labour	Robert Maxwell	24,854	47.5	+1.6
Conservative	Elaine Kellett-Bowman	22,600	43.2	+0.2
Liberal	John M Cornwall	4,914	9.4	−1.7
Majority		2,254	4.3	+1.4
Turnout		52,368	85.8	−0.7
Labour hold		Swing	+0.7	

General election 1964: Buckingham
Party	Candidate	Votes	%	±%
Labour	Robert Maxwell	23,085	45.9	+2.6
Conservative	Elaine Kellett-Bowman	21,604	43.0	−4.0
Liberal	Jack Raphael Wallis	5,578	11.1	+1.4
Majority		1,181	2.9	N/A
Turnout		50,267	86.5	+0.1
Labour gain from Conservative		Swing	+3.3	

=== Elections in the 1950s ===
General election 1959: Buckingham
Party	Candidate	Votes	%	±%
Conservative	Frank Markham	22,304	47.0	−4.3
Labour	Robert Maxwell	20,558	43.3	−5.4
Liberal	Evan Laurence Frederick Richards	4,577	9.7	New
Majority		1,746	3.7	+1.1
Turnout		47,439	86.4	+1.3
Conservative hold		Swing	+0.6	

General election 1955: Buckingham
Party	Candidate	Votes	%	±%
Conservative	Frank Markham	23,250	51.3	+1.2
Labour	David Gordon Evans	22,110	48.7	−1.2
Majority		1,140	2.6	+2.4
Turnout		45,360	85.1	−1.5
Conservative hold		Swing	+1.2	

General election 1951: Buckingham
Party	Candidate	Votes	%	±%
Conservative	Frank Markham	22,688	50.1	+6.7
Labour	Aidan Crawley	22,634	49.9	+2.8
Majority		54	0.2	N/A
Turnout		45,322	86.6	+0.4
Conservative gain from Labour		Swing	+2.0	

General election 1950: Buckingham
Party	Candidate	Votes	%	±%
Labour	Aidan Crawley	20,782	47.1	−7.6
Conservative	Frank Markham	19,128	43.4	−1.9
Liberal	John Denis Gilbert Kellock	4,196	9.5	New
Majority		1,654	3.7	−5.7
Turnout		44,106	86.2	+13.4
Labour hold		Swing	−2.9	

=== Elections in the 1940s ===
General election 1945: Buckingham
Party	Candidate	Votes	%	±%
Labour	Aidan Crawley	22,302	54.7	+12.7
Conservative	Lionel Berry	18,457	45.3	−12.7
Majority		3,845	9.4	N/A
Turnout		40,759	71.8	–3.3
Labour gain from Conservative		Swing	+12.7	

1943 Buckingham by-election
Party	Candidate	Votes	%	±%
Conservative	Lionel Berry	Unopposed		
Conservative hold				

=== Elections in the 1930s ===
1937 Buckingham by-election
Party	Candidate	Votes	%	±%
Conservative	John Whiteley	17,919	52.6	−5.4
Labour	James Viner Delahaye	12,820	37.6	−4.4
Liberal	E.J. Boyce	3,348	9.8	New
Majority		5,099	15.0	−1.0
Turnout		34,087	71.4	−3.7
Conservative hold		Swing		

General election 1935: Buckingham
Party	Candidate	Votes	%	±%
Conservative	George Bowyer	20,616	58.0	−9.0
Labour	Joseph Sparks	14,928	42.0	+9.0
Majority		5,688	16.0	−17.9
Turnout		35,544	75.13	−2.60
Conservative hold		Swing		

General election 1931: Buckingham
Party	Candidate	Votes	%	±%
Conservative	George Bowyer	23,783	66.96	
Labour	James Lievsley George	11,736	33.04	
Majority		12,047	33.92	
Turnout		35,519	77.73	
Conservative hold		Swing		

=== Elections in the 1920s ===
General election 1929: Buckingham
Party	Candidate	Votes	%	±%
Unionist	George Bowyer	16,375	45.8	−6.0
Labour	James Lievsley George	11,718	32.7	+2.1
Liberal	Norman Crump	7,713	21.5	+3.9
Majority		4,657	13.1	−8.1
Turnout		35,806	79.6	+1.5
Registered electors		44,974		
Unionist hold		Swing	−4.1	

General election 1924: Buckingham
Party	Candidate	Votes	%	±%
Unionist	George Bowyer	15,129	51.8	−1.2
Labour	E. J. Pay	8,939	30.6	−16.4
Liberal	Richard Kingsley Johnson	5,144	17.6	New
Majority		6,190	21.2	+15.2
Turnout		29,212	78.1	+9.7
Registered electors		37,394		
Unionist hold		Swing	+7.6	

General election 1923: Buckingham
Party	Candidate	Votes	%	±%
Unionist	George Bowyer	13,351	53.0	+3.6
Labour	E. J. Pay	11,824	47.0	+20.7
Majority		1,527	6.0	−17.1
Turnout		25,175	68.4	−8.5
Registered electors		36,785		
Unionist hold		Swing	−8.6	

General election 1922: Buckingham
Party	Candidate	Votes	%	±%
Unionist	George Bowyer	13,751	49.4	−4.3
Labour	Owen Connellan	7,343	26.3	−6.0
Liberal	Charles Hobhouse	6,789	24.3	+10.3
Majority		6,408	23.1	+1.7
Turnout		27,883	76.9	+13.3
Registered electors		36,262		
Unionist hold		Swing	+0.9	

=== Elections in the 1910s ===
General election 1918: Buckingham
Party		Candidate	Votes	%	±%
C	Unionist	George Bowyer	12,441	53.7	+5.1
	Labour	John Scurr	7,481	32.3	New
	Liberal	Harry Verney	3,250	14.0	−37.4
Majority			4,960	21.4	N/A
Turnout			23,172	63.6	−26.1
Registered electors			36,434		
	Unionist gain from Liberal		Swing	N/A	
C indicates candidate endorsed by the coalition government.

Verney

General election December 1910: Buckingham
Party	Candidate	Votes	%	±%
Liberal	Harry Verney	6,029	51.4	+0.9
Liberal Unionist	Francis Tyringham Higgins Bernard	5,702	48.6	−0.9
Majority		327	2.8	+1.8
Turnout		11,731	89.7	−2.0
Liberal hold		Swing	+0.9	

General election January 1910: Buckingham
Party	Candidate	Votes	%	±%
Liberal	Frederick Verney	6,055	50.5	−6.7
Conservative	Thomas Fremantle	5,944	49.5	+6.7
Majority		111	1.0	−13.4
Turnout		11,999	91.7	+3.1
Liberal hold		Swing	-6.7	

=== Elections in the 1900s ===
Frederick Verney

General election 1906: Buckingham
Party	Candidate	Votes	%	±%
Liberal	Frederick Verney	6,253	57.2	+9.3
Conservative	Thomas Fremantle	4,673	42.8	−9.3
Majority		1,580	14.4	N/A
Turnout		10,926	88.6	+4.9
Registered electors		12,334		
Liberal gain from Conservative		Swing	+9.3	

General election 1900: Buckingham
Party	Candidate	Votes	%	±%
Conservative	William Carlile	5,101	52.1	−0.1
Liberal	Hubert Beaumont	4,684	47.9	+0.1
Majority		417	4.2	−0.2
Turnout		9,785	83.7	−4.9
Registered electors		11,685		
Conservative hold		Swing	−0.1	

=== Elections in the 1890s ===
General election 1895: Buckingham
Party	Candidate	Votes	%	±%
Conservative	William Carlile	5,266	52.2	+4.5
Liberal	Herbert Leon	4,830	47.8	−4.5
Majority		436	4.4	N/A
Turnout		10,096	88.6	+3.0
Registered electors		11,395		
Conservative gain from Liberal		Swing	+4.5	

General election 1892: Buckingham
Party	Candidate	Votes	%	±%
Liberal	Herbert Leon	5,153	52.3	+3.7
Conservative	William Carlile	4,704	47.7	−3.7
Majority		449	4.6	N/A
Turnout		9,857	85.6	+7.3
Registered electors		11,518		
Liberal gain from Conservative		Swing	+3.4	

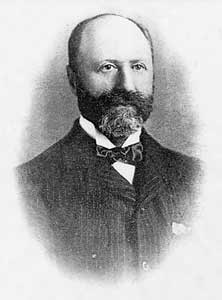
Leon

1891 Buckingham by-election
Party	Candidate	Votes	%	±%
Liberal	Herbert Leon	5,013	52.0	+2.4
Conservative	Evelyn Hubbard	4,632	48.0	−2.4
Majority		381	4.0	N/A
Turnout		9,645	84.6	+6.3
Registered electors		11,407		
Liberal gain from Conservative		Swing	+2.4	

=== Elections in the 1880s ===
By-election, 11 Oct 1889: Buckingham
Party	Candidate	Votes	%	±%
Liberal	Edmund Verney	4,855	51.1	+1.5
Conservative	Evelyn Hubbard	4,647	48.9	−1.5
Majority		208	2.2	N/A
Turnout		9,502	75.6	−2.7
Registered electors		12,565		
Liberal gain from Conservative		Swing	+1.5	

- Caused by Hubbard's elevation to the peerage, becoming Lord Addington.

General election 1886: Buckingham
Party	Candidate	Votes	%	±%
Conservative	Egerton Hubbard	4,460	50.4	+8.1
Liberal	Edmund Verney	4,389	49.6	−8.1
Majority		71	0.8	N/A
Turnout		8,849	78.3	−5.4
Registered electors		11,307		
Conservative gain from Liberal		Swing	+8.1	

General election 1885: Buckingham
Party	Candidate	Votes	%
Liberal	Edmund Verney	5,462	57.7
Conservative	Samuel Wilson	4,006	42.3
Majority		1,456	15.4
Turnout		9,468	83.7
Registered electors		11,307	
Liberal win (new boundaries)			

== Election results 1868–1885 ==
=== Elections in the 1880s ===
General election 1880: Buckingham
Party	Candidate	Votes	%	±%
Liberal	Harry Verney	528	50.4	+10.5
Conservative	Egerton Hubbard	520	49.6	−10.5
Majority		8	0.8	N/A
Turnout		1,048	91.2	+3.5
Registered electors		1,149		
Liberal gain from Conservative		Swing	+10.5	

=== Elections in the 1870s ===
General election 1874: Buckingham
Party	Candidate	Votes	%	±%
Conservative	Egerton Hubbard	589	60.1	+17.9
Liberal	Harry Verney	391	39.9	−17.9
Majority		198	20.2	N/A
Turnout		980	87.7	+3.2
Registered electors		1,118		
Conservative gain from Liberal		Swing	+17.9	

=== Elections in the 1860s ===
General election 1868: Buckingham
Party	Candidate	Votes	%	±%
Liberal	Harry Verney	463	57.8	N/A
Conservative	John Hubbard	338	42.2	N/A
Majority		125	15.6	N/A
Turnout		801	84.5	N/A
Registered electors		948		
Liberal hold		Swing	N/A	

== Election results Pre 1868 ==
=== Elections in the 1860s ===
General election 1865: Buckingham
Party	Candidate	Votes	%	±%
Liberal	Harry Verney	Unopposed		
Conservative	John Hubbard	Unopposed		
Registered electors		948		
Liberal hold				
Conservative hold				

=== Elections in the 1850s ===
General election 1859: Buckingham
Party	Candidate	Votes	%	±%
Liberal	Harry Verney	198	36.6	−21.8
Conservative	John Hubbard	196	36.2	+9.2
Conservative	George Barrington	147	27.2	+12.6
Majority		2	0.4	−7.1
Turnout		271 (est)	74.3 (est)	−4.8
Registered electors		364		
Liberal hold		Swing	−21.8	
Conservative hold		Swing	+10.1	

General election 1857: Buckingham
Party	Candidate	Votes	%	±%
Whig	Harry Verney	193	34.5	New
Conservative	John Hall	151	27.0	N/A
Whig	Richard Cavendish	134	23.9	New
Conservative	Philip Box	82	14.6	N/A
Turnout		280 (est)	79.1 (est)	N/A
Registered electors		354		
Majority		111	19.9	N/A
Whig gain from Conservative		Swing	N/A	
Majority		17	3.1	N/A
Conservative hold		Swing	N/A	

General election 1852: Buckingham
Party	Candidate	Votes	%	±%
Conservative	John Hall	Unopposed		
Conservative	Richard Temple-Nugent-Brydges-Chandos-Grenville	Unopposed		
Registered electors		349		
Conservative hold				
Conservative hold				

By-election, 5 March 1852: Buckingham
Party	Candidate	Votes	%	±%
Conservative	Richard Temple-Nugent-Brydges-Chandos-Grenville	Unopposed		
Conservative hold				

- Caused by Temple-Nugent-Brydges-Chandos-Grenville's appointment as a Lord Commissioner of the Treasury.

=== Elections in the 1840s ===
General election 1847: Buckingham
Party	Candidate	Votes	%	±%
Conservative	John Hall	Unopposed		
Conservative	Richard Temple-Nugent-Brydges-Chandos-Grenville	Unopposed		
Registered electors		388		
Conservative hold				
Conservative hold				

By-election, 11 February 1846: Buckingham
Party	Candidate	Votes	%	±%
Conservative	Richard Temple-Nugent-Brydges-Chandos-Grenville	Unopposed		
Conservative hold				

- Caused by Fremantle's resignation by accepting the office of Steward of the Chiltern Hundreds

By-election, 20 January 1846: Buckingham
Party	Candidate	Votes	%	±%
Conservative	John Hall	Unopposed		
Conservative hold				

- Caused by Chetwode's death.

By-election, 10 February 1845: Buckingham
Party	Candidate	Votes	%	±%
Conservative	Thomas Fremantle	Unopposed		
Conservative hold				

- Caused by Fremantle's appointment as Chief Secretary to the Lord Lieutenant of Ireland

By-election, 25 May 1844: Buckingham
Party	Candidate	Votes	%	±%
Conservative	Thomas Fremantle	Unopposed		
Conservative hold				

- Caused by Fremantle's appointment as Secretary at War

General election 1841: Buckingham
Party	Candidate	Votes	%	±%
Conservative	Thomas Fremantle	Unopposed		
Conservative	John Chetwode	Unopposed		
Registered electors		396		
Conservative hold				
Conservative gain from Whig				

=== Elections in the 1830s ===
General election 1837: Buckingham
Party	Candidate	Votes	%	±%
Conservative	Thomas Fremantle	236	44.4	N/A
Whig	Harry Verney	157	29.6	N/A
Conservative	John Chetwode	138	26.0	N/A
Turnout		299	87.7	N/A
Registered electors		341		
Majority		79	14.8	N/A
Conservative hold				
Majority		19	3.6	N/A
Whig hold				

General election 1835: Buckingham
Party	Candidate	Votes	%	±%
Conservative	Thomas Fremantle	Unopposed		
Whig	Harry Verney	Unopposed		
Registered electors		351		
Conservative hold				

General election 1832: Buckingham
Party	Candidate	Votes	%	±%
Whig	Harry Verney	175	37.3	New
Tory	Thomas Fremantle	156	33.3	N/A
Whig	George Morgan	138	29.4	New
Turnout		270	90.0	N/A
Registered electors		300		
Majority		19	4.0	N/A
Whig gain from Tory				
Majority		18	3.9	N/A
Tory hold				

General election 1831: Buckingham
Party	Candidate	Votes	%	±%
Tory	Thomas Fremantle	Unopposed		
Tory	George Nugent	Unopposed		
Tory hold				

General election 1830: Buckingham
Party	Candidate	Votes	%	±%
Tory	Thomas Fremantle	Unopposed		
Tory	George Nugent	Unopposed		
Tory hold				

== See also ==
- List of parliamentary constituencies in Buckinghamshire

== Sources ==
- Iain Dale, ed. (2003). The Times House of Commons 1929, 1931, 1935. Politico's (reprint). ISBN 1-84275-033-X.
- The Times House of Commons 1945. 1945.
- The Times House of Commons 1950. 1950.
- The Times House of Commons 1955. 1955.

Parliament of the United Kingdom
Vacant since 1754 Title last held by Sussex	Constituency represented by the prime minister 1763–1765	Vacant until 1766 Title next held by Bath
Preceded by Glasgow North East	Constituency represented by the speaker 2009–2019	Succeeded by Chorley
