= Edward Floyd =

Edward Floyd may refer to:

- Edward Floyd (impeached barrister) (1621–1648), Englishman impeached and sentenced by Parliament
- Edward Floyd (Medal of Honor) (1850–1923), US Navy sailor
- Eddie Floyd (born 1937), American singer-songwriter

== See also ==
- Edward Floyd-Jones (1823–1901), New York politician
- Edward Lloyd (disambiguation)
