= Norman Crump =

British financial and economic authority and Liberal Party politician

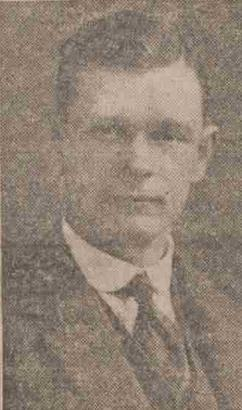

Norman Easedale Crump FRSS (10 January 1896 – 22 January 1964) was a British financial and economic authority and Liberal Party politician. He was City Editor of The Sunday Times for 20 years.

== Background ==
Crump was the son of Charles George Crump, who was Principal Assistant Keeper at the Public Record Office. He was educated at Winchester College, Hampshire, where, in 1914, he obtained a scholarship to Cambridge University. However, due to the outbreak of war he did not go to University. In 1927, he married Kathleen Mary St Patrick Hodson. They had two sons and one daughter.

== Professional career ==
In 1914, at the age of 18, Crump enlisted in the Middlesex Regiment and the Royal Engineers Signal Service. In 1919, rather than go back to studying, he took a job with the Federation of British Industries. He moved to become Assistant Secretary to the Chairman of the Westminster Bank in 1921. At the same time he additionally took on the role of Statistical Correspondent for the Financial Times. In 1927 he joined The Economist. By 1929, he had become Assistant Editor and was already regarded as an authority on financial, economic and statistical matters. In 1930 he additionally became Assistant Editor for The Banker and Editor of the Lloyds Bank Monthly Review. In 1939 he left The Economist and withdrew from his other editorial roles to take a job as City Editor at The Sunday Times in London. He remained City Editor until he retired in 1960. He was a Fellow of the Royal Statistical Society.

== Political career ==
Crump was Liberal candidate for the North Bucks division of Buckinghamshire at the 1929 General Election. This was a Unionist seat that the Liberals had not won since the December 1910 General Election. At the previous general election in 1924, the Liberals had come a clear third, so he could not have had high hopes of winning. In 1929, with the Liberal party experiencing something of a revival, he managed to increase the Liberal vote share, but remained in third place;

General Election 1929: Buckingham Electorate 44,974
Party	Candidate	Votes	%	±%
Unionist	George Edward Wentworth Bowyer	16,375	45.8	−6.0
Labour	James Lievsley George	11,718	32.7	+2.1
Liberal	Norman Easedale Crump	7,713	21.5	+3.9
Majority		4,657	13.1	−8.1
Turnout			79.6	+1.5
Unionist hold		Swing	-4.0	

He did not stand for parliament again. He remained active in the Liberal Party speaking in 1931 at the Annual Meeting of the National Liberal Federation on the current financial crisis.

== Publications ==
He wrote mainly on economic and financial matters in various pamphlets. From 1924 he was part author of the later editions of The ABC of the Foreign Exchanges. His most notable published works included;

- A First Book of Economics, 1930
- By Rail to Victory, 1947
