= Edward Gifford =

Edward Gifford may refer to:

- Edward Winslow Gifford (1887–1959), ethnographer
- Edward Gifford (MP) (c. 1485–1556), MP for Buckingham
- Edward Gifford, a character in the film Trial by Combat
