= Sir Richard Temple, 3rd Baronet =

English politician

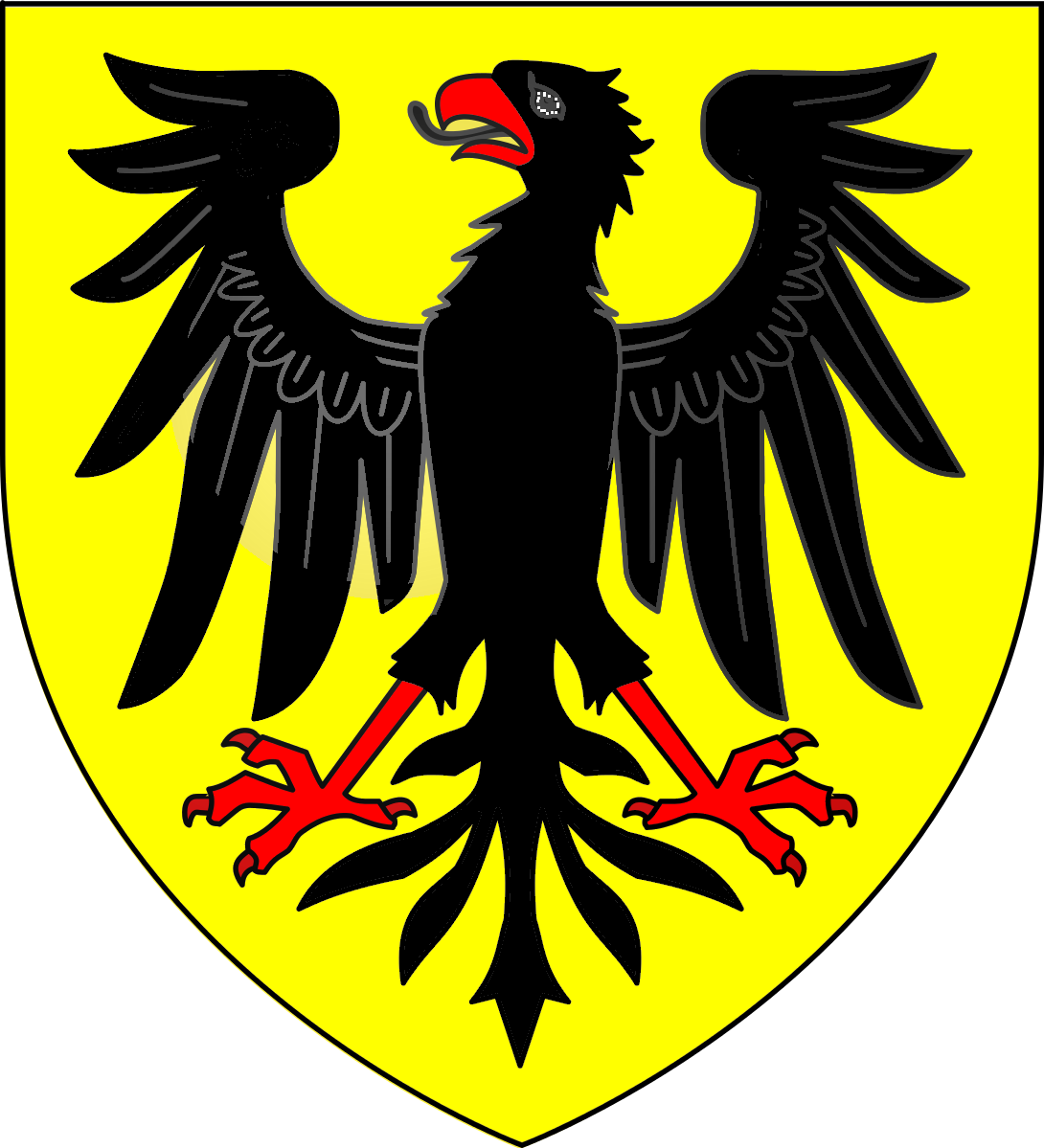
Arms of Temple of Stowe: Or, an eagle displayed sable

Sir Richard Temple, 3rd Baronet, KB (28 March 1634 – 8 May 1697) was an English politician who sat in the House of Commons at various times between 1654 and 1697.

== Life ==
Temple was the son of Sir Peter Temple, 2nd Baronet of Stowe and his second wife Christian Leveson, daughter of Sir John Leveson. He was admitted at Gray's Inn on 6 November 1648 and at Emmanuel College, Cambridge on 23 December 1648. He inherited the baronetcy on the death of his father in September 1653.

In 1654, Temple was elected Member of Parliament for Warwickshire in the First Protectorate Parliament and in 1659, he was elected MP for Buckingham in the Third Protectorate Parliament.

Temple was elected MP again for Buckingham in 1660 for the Convention Parliament. The Convention Parliament enacted a new Militia Act that returned the militia to local control, and the Buckinghamshire committee quickly organised the county force. Temple was appointed Colonel of the Buckinghamshire Militia Foot

After the Stuart Restoration Temple was made Knight of the Bath on 18 April 1661. He was re-elected in 1661 for the Cavalier Parliament and sat until 1679. He was a member of the council for foreign plantations in 1671 and commissioner of customs from 1672 to 1694. He took a leading part against the Popish Plot, and for excluding James, Duke of York from the crown. In the February 1679 election there was a double return and Sir Peter Tyrell was declared elected. However Temple regained the seat in August 1679 and held it until his death in 1697. In 1676 Temple commissioned a new house at Stowe which forms the core of the present building.

== Death ==
Sir Richard Temple, 3rd Baronet, died at the age of 63.

== Family ==
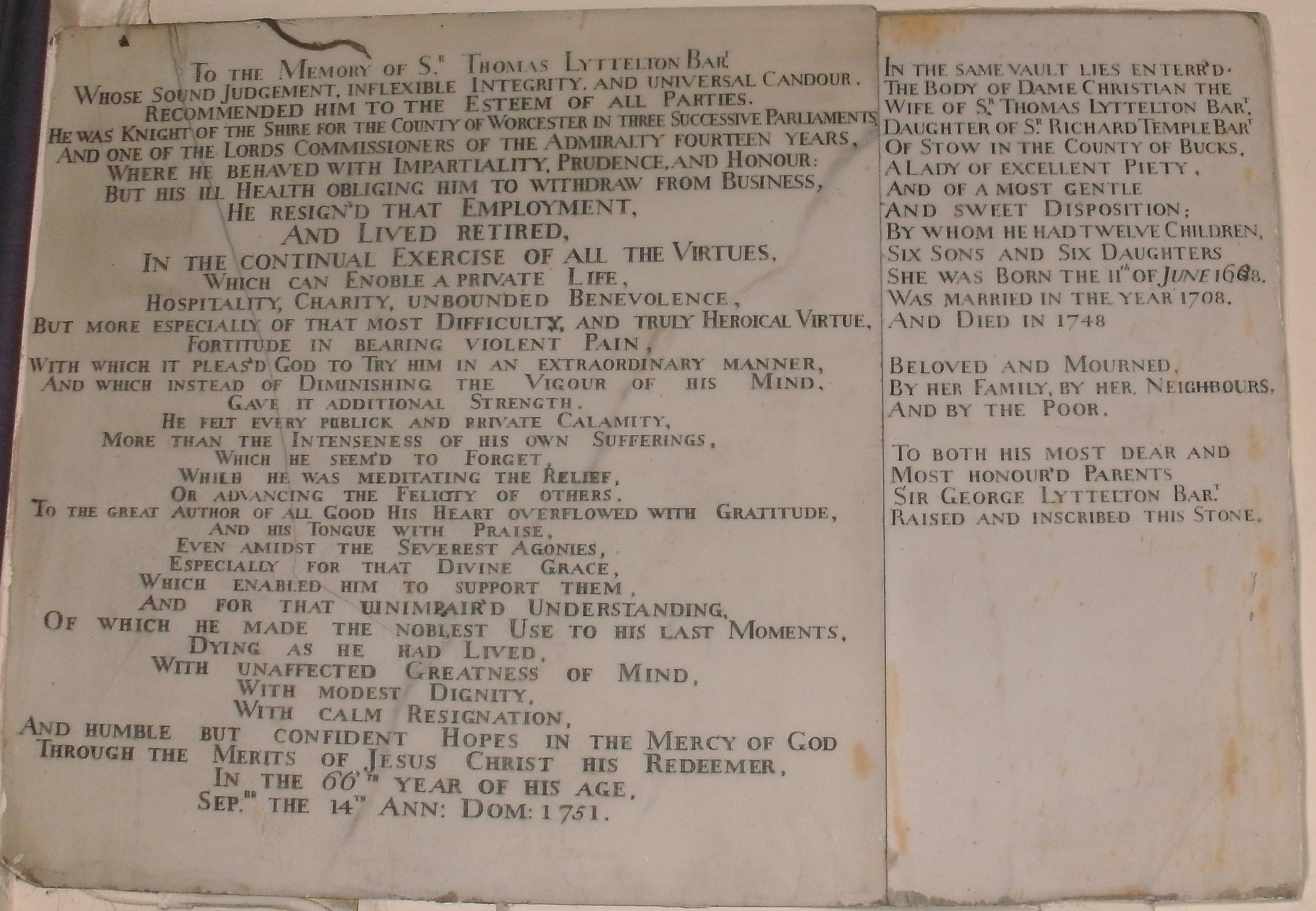
St John the Baptist Church, Hagley, memorial to Sir Thomas Lyttelton, 4th Baronet (1686–1751) and his wife Christian, née Temple

Temple married Mary Knapp, daughter of Henry Knapp of Woodcote, South Stoke, Oxfordshire on 25 August 1675. He had several children:

- His son Sir Richard Temple, 4th Baronet, inherited the baronetcy and was raised to the peerage as Viscount Cobham.
- His eldest daughter Maria married Richard West.
- His 2nd daughter Hester married, 25 Nov 1710 in Wotton Underwood, Bucks., England, Richard Grenville (1678–1727) She (Hester) had succeeded to the estate of her brother Richard Temple, 1st Viscount Cobham, at Stowe, which henceforth became the family's chief seat, and with which Wotton descended until the death of the last Duke of Buckingham and Chandos in 1889. She then became the 1st Countess of Temple.
- Christian, a younger daughter, married Sir Thomas Lyttelton, 4th Baronet. When her brother Sir Richard Temple, 4th Baronet was created Viscount Cobham, it was with special remainder (in default of his own heirs male) to his sister Hester and her heirs male and in default of them to the heirs male of Christian. This latter remainder took effect in 1889 when her descendant Charles, Lord Lyttelton succeeded as Viscount Cobham.

Parliament of England
| Preceded by John St Nicholas; Richard Lucy | Member of Parliament for Warwickshire; 1654; With: Richard Lucy; Thomas Willoughby; William Purefoy | Succeeded by Richard Lucy; Sir Roger Burgoyn; Edward Peyto; Joseph Hawksworth |
| Preceded by Francis Ingoldsby | Member of Parliament for Buckingham; 1659; With: Francis Ingoldsby | Succeeded by John Dormer |
| Preceded by John Dormer | Member of Parliament for Buckingham; 1660–1679; With: John Dormer 1660; Sir William Smyth, Bt 1661–1679 | Succeeded by Viscount Latimer; Sir Peter Tyrrell, Bt |
| Preceded by Viscount Latimer; Sir Peter Tyrrell, Bt | Member of Parliament for Buckingham; 1679–1697; With: Viscount Latimer 1679–1681; Sir Ralph Verney, Bt 1681–1690; Alexander Denton 1690–1697 | Succeeded by Alexander Denton; Sir Richard Temple, Bt |
Baronetage of England
| Preceded by Peter Temple | Baronet (of Stowe); 1637–1653 | Succeeded by Richard Temple |
