= John Hasilwood =

16th-century English politician

John Hasilwood (by 1485 – 1544) was an English politician. He was an MP and a member of the Middle Temple. He was an MP for Buckingham in 1529. Little is known of Hasilwood. He was not re-elected in 1536; it is thought this was because of his closeness to the faction of Henry VIII's second wife, Anne Boleyn, who had recently been executed for treason and adultery.

== Origins and identification ==
Several contemporaries named John Hasilwood are recorded in London and the home counties during this period, and historians have identified two men as candidates for the Buckingham MP of 1529. One was the son and heir of Edmund Hasilwood of Maidwell, Northamptonshire, known as Hasilwood "of the Fleet" after his father's post as warden of the Fleet prison; he inherited his father's estate in 1527 and died in 1550. The stronger candidate for the MP, however, is John Hasilwood "of the Receipt", an Exchequer official whose background is otherwise obscure, though he may have been connected to a Hasilwood family living at Bulmer, Essex.

== Family and education ==
Hasilwood was born by 1485. He was admitted to the Middle Temple on 26 April 1502, was chosen master of revels there later that year, and was elected butler for Christmas 1503 under the name "Hasilwood junior". There is no further record of him at the Middle Temple after 1520, although in his 1544 will he left 40 shillings toward the upkeep of the inn's buildings, describing himself as a fellow of the institution.

== Career ==
Hasilwood was appointed teller of the Exchequer on 23 June 1506, an office he held until his death. He later became comptroller of customs for the port of London from 1532 until at least 1536, a commissioner for the tenths of spiritualities in Essex and Colchester in 1535, and a justice of the peace for Essex from 1534 or 1535 until his death. Earlier in his career he served the 3rd Duke of Buckingham: by 1519 he was joint keeper of the duke's park at Writtle, Essex, alongside a woman recorded only as "Mistress Philips" of London, and by the following year the pair had lent the duke over £1,800.

Historians have suggested that Hasilwood's nomination as MP for Buckingham may have owed something to his exchequer colleague Sir John Dauntesey, or to the courtier Henry Norris, a close friend of both the King and Anne Boleyn. In 1534 Norris successfully petitioned the King to grant Hasilwood a renewed exchequer appointment, to be held jointly with Roger Chaloner, after Thomas Cromwell had declined a similar request in favour of another candidate. This connection to Norris, who was executed in 1536 alongside Anne Boleyn on charges of adultery with the Queen, is considered a likely explanation for why Hasilwood and his fellow Buckingham MP, Edward Lloyd, were not returned to the following Parliament.

== Death ==
Hasilwood's will was dated 16 January 1544. Describing himself as being of Waltham, he asked to be buried at the church of St Helen's, Bishopsgate, and left £10 for the repair of the road between London and Waltham. He had a significant connection to the Leathersellers' Company, to which he had given £300 and plate to help fund the 1543 purchase of the former St Helen's Priory site as the Company's hall; in return, the Company agreed to support four almsmen and three almswomen to pray for his soul. A property owned by the Company in Bishopsgate is still known as "Hasilwood House" in his memory. His will was proved on 2 May 1544; his executors included Sir Robert Tyrwhitt and Robert Smith of the Exchequer, with Sir Richard Lyster, Chief Baron of the Exchequer, appointed as overseer.

Parliament of England
Unknown	Member of Parliament for Buckingham; 1529; With: Edward Lloyd	Succeeded by Thomas Pope with George Gifford
