= Bertram Bowyer, 2nd Baron Denham =

British peer and politician (1927–2021)

The Right Honourable The Lord Denham KBE PC
- Portrait by Walter Bird, 1963

Chief Whip of the House of Lords; Captain of the Honourable Corps of Gentlemen-at-Arms
- In office 4 May 1979 – 22 May 1991
- Prime Minister: Margaret Thatcher; John Major
- Preceded by: The Baroness Llewelyn-Davies of Hastoe
- Succeeded by: The Lord Hesketh

Deputy Chief Whip of the House of Lords Captain of the Yeomen of the Guard
- In office 20 November 1971 – 11 March 1974
- Prime Minister: Edward Heath
- Preceded by: The Viscount Goschen
- Succeeded by: The Lord Strabolgi

Lord-in-waiting
- Government Whip
- In office 24 June 1970 – 20 November 1971
- Prime Minister: Edward Heath
- Preceded by: The Lord Hilton of Upton
- Succeeded by: The Lord Bethell
- In office 27 June 1961 – 16 October 1964
- Prime Minister: Harold Macmillan; Alec Douglas-Home
- Preceded by: The Earl Jellicoe
- Succeeded by: The Lord Hobson of Brent

Member of the House of Lords
- Lord Temporal
- Hereditary peerage 9 December 1949 – 11 November 1999
- Preceded by: The 1st Baron Denham
- Succeeded by: Seat abolished
- Elected Hereditary Peer; 11 November 1999 – 26 April 2021
- Election: 1999
- Preceded by: Seat established
- Succeeded by: The 8th Earl of Leicester

Personal details
- Born: Bertram Stanley Mitford Bowyer; 3 October 1927 Newport Pagnell, England
- Died: 1 December 2021 (aged 94) Milton Keynes, England
- Party: Conservative
- Education: King's College, Cambridge
- Other titles: 10th Baronet (of Denham Court) and 2nd Baronet (of Weston Underwood)

Bertram Stanley Mitford Bowyer, 2nd Baron Denham (3 October 1927 – 1 December 2021), was a British Conservative politician, hereditary peer, writer and member of the House of Lords. He is one of few people to have served in the governments of five different prime ministers.

== Family background ==
Born in Newport Pagnell, Denham was educated at Eton and King's College, Cambridge. He was the youngest child and second son of George Bowyer, 1st Baron Denham, and succeeded his father to become 2nd Baron Denham and 2nd Baronet, of Weston Underwood, when he died in 1948, his elder brother having been killed in the Second World War. In 1950, he also succeeded his kinsman, Sir George Bowyer, 9th Baronet, in the Bowyer baronetcy of Denham Court, becoming the 10th Baronet.

Denham's mother was the Hon. Daphne Freeman-Mitford (1895–1996), youngest daughter of Bertram Freeman-Mitford, 1st Baron Redesdale, making Denham a first cousin of the Mitford sisters and their brother Thomas (Tom).

== Political career ==
Denham served as a House of Lords whip from 1961 until 1964, under both Harold Macmillan and Alec Douglas-Home. Upon the Conservatives return to power at the 1970 general election, he was once again made a whip under Edward Heath. In 1972, he was promoted to become Captain of the Yeomen of the Guard, the post associated with being the Government Deputy Chief Whip in the House of Lords. He served in this post until the Conservatives left power in 1974.

Upon the victory of Margaret Thatcher in the 1979 general election, Denham was made Captain of the Gentlemen-at-Arms, the post associated with being Government Chief Whip in the House of Lords. He held the post for the entirety of the Thatcher years, leaving office six months into the John Major government in 1991. He was made a Privy Councillor in the 1981 New Year Honours, and in the 1991 New Year Honours was appointed a Knight Commander of the Order of the British Empire (KBE) for his political service.

With the passage of the House of Lords Act 1999, Denham and almost all other hereditary peers lost their automatic right to sit in the House of Lords. He was however elected as one of the 92 elected hereditary peers to remain in the Lords pending completion of House of Lords reform. Following the death of Lord Carrington in July 2018, Denham became the longest-serving current member of the House of Lords. He retired from the House after 71 years' service on 26 April 2021. At his retirement, he was the last member of the Lords to have taken his seat during the reign of George VI.

Denham died in Milton Keynes on 1 December 2021, at the age of 94.

== Literary career ==
As Bertie Denham, Bowyer wrote four mysteries featuring detection by House of Lords Conservative Whip Derek Thyrde, second Viscount Thyrde. He was a member of the Detection Club, and contributed to their 2020 anthology Howdunit: A Masterclass in Crime Writing by Members of the Detection Club.

=== Novels by Bertie Denham ===
- The Man Who Lost His Shadow (1979) OCLC 5652900 (complete list of all editions)
- Two Thyrdes (1983) OCLC 12462501 (complete list of all editions)
- Foxhunt (1988) OCLC 23870741 (complete list of all editions)
- Black Rod (1997) OCLC 39504349 (complete list of all editions)

== Arms ==
Coat of arms of Bertram Bowyer, 2nd Baron Denham
Crest A falcon rising belled Or. Escutcheon Or a bend Vaire cottised Sable. Supporters Dexter a golden retriever sinister a black greyhound Proper each charged on the shoulder with a portcullis Or.

== Sources ==
- "Denham". Who's Who. A & C Black. (Subscription or UK public library membership required.)
- Leigh Rayment's Peerage Pages – Peerages beginning with "D" (part 2)

Political offices
Preceded by The Viscount Goschen	Deputy Chief Whip in the House of Lords; 1971–1974	Succeeded by The Lord Strabolgi
Preceded by The Viscount Goschen	Captain of the Yeomen of the Guard; 1971–1974	Succeeded by The Lord Strabolgi
Preceded by The Baroness Llewelyn-Davies of Hastoe	Chief Whip in the House of Lords; 1979–1991	Succeeded by The Lord Hesketh
Preceded by The Baroness Llewelyn-Davies of Hastoe	Captain of the Honourable Corps of Gentlemen-at-Arms; 1979–1991	Succeeded by The Lord Hesketh
Party political offices
Preceded by The Earl St Aldwyn	Conservative Chief Whip in the House of Lords; 1978–1991	Succeeded by The Lord Hesketh
Records
Preceded by The Lord Carrington	Longest-serving member in the House of Lords; 2018–2021	Succeeded by The Lord Trefgarne
Parliament of the United Kingdom
New office created by the House of Lords Act 1999	Elected hereditary peer to the House of Lords under the House of Lords Act 1999; 1999–2021	Succeeded by The Earl of Leicester
Peerage of the United Kingdom
Preceded by George Bowyer	Baron Denham; 1948–2021; Member of the House of Lords (1949–1999)	Succeeded by Richard Bowyer
Baronetage of the United Kingdom
Preceded by George Bowyer	Baronet of Weston Underwood; 1948–2021	Succeeded by Richard Bowyer
Baronetage of England
Preceded by Sir George Bowyer	Baronet of Denham Court; 1950–2021	Succeeded by Richard Bowyer
