= John Whiteley (politician) =

British politician

Brigadier John Percival Whiteley OBE (7 January 1898 – 4 July 1943) was a British Army officer and a Conservative Party politician.

Born in January 1898 in South Africa, Whiteley was commissioned into the Royal Artillery during the First World War, ending the war as a lieutenant. In 1926 he transferred to the Life Guards, retiring in 1928 and joining the 99th (Buckinghamshire and Berkshire Yeomanry) Field Brigade, Royal Artillery (Territorial Army) as a captain. He was promoted major in 1932.

He stood unsuccessfully at the 1929 general election in Birmingham Aston, and entered the House of Commons eight years later when he was elected as Member of Parliament (MP) for Buckingham at a by-election in 1937, after the sitting MP George Bowyer was elevated to the peerage as Baron Denham.

When World War II broke out, Whiteley resumed military service. He was active at Dunkirk, and died in 1943, aged 45, when he was killed in a plane crash in Gibraltar, along with the Conservative MP Victor Cazalet and General Władysław Sikorski, the leader of the Polish government-in-exile.

Parliament of the United Kingdom
Preceded by George Bowyer	Member of Parliament for Buckingham; 1937–1943	Succeeded by Lionel Berry
