= John Hall (Buckingham MP) =

British politician

General John Hall (1799 – 5 May 1872) was a British Conservative Party politician. He was elected unopposed as one of the two Members of Parliament (MPs) for Buckingham at a by-election January 1846, and was returned at the next three elections until he stood down from the House of Commons at the 1859 general election.

He belonged to the Hall family of Weston Colville, Cambridgeshire, his father being John Hall (1767–1860). In the 1860s, the family moved within the county to Six Mile Bottom, to an estate that passed to General John Hall's nephew on his death without issue.

Hall entered the British Army in 1817, becoming a lieutenant-colonel in the 1st Life Guards in 1837, and major-general in 1855.

Parliament of the United Kingdom
| Preceded by Sir John Chetwode, Bt; Sir Thomas Fremantle, Bt | Member of Parliament for Buckingham; 1846 – 1859; With: Sir Thomas Fremantle, Bt to February 1846; Marquess of Chandos February 1846–1857; Sir Harry Verney, Bt from 1857 | Succeeded by John Gellibrand Hubbard; Sir Harry Verney, Bt |
