= Edward Osborne, Viscount Latimer =

English politician

Edward Osborne MP

Member of Parliament for Corfe Castle

Viscount Latimer
- In office 1677 – February 1679 Serving with John Tregonwell
- Preceded by: Ralph Bankes
- Succeeded by: Peregrine Osborne

Member of Parliament for Buckingham
- In office 1679–1681 Serving with Richard Temple
- Preceded by: Sir William Smyth, 1st Baronet
- Succeeded by: Sir Ralph Verney, 1st Baronet, of Middle Claydon

Personal details
- Born: 3 April 1654 or 1655
- Died: January 1689 (aged 34 or 35)

Edward Osborne, Viscount Latimer (3 April 1654/1655 – January 1689) was an English politician.

He was succeeded by his brother Peregrine Osborne, 2nd Duke of Leeds.

His wife Elizabeth, Lady Latimer was buried in Westminster Abbey with their daughter and son.

== See also ==
- List of MPs elected to the English Parliament in 1661
