= HMS Albion (1763) =

74-gun third-rate ship of the line of the Royal Navy

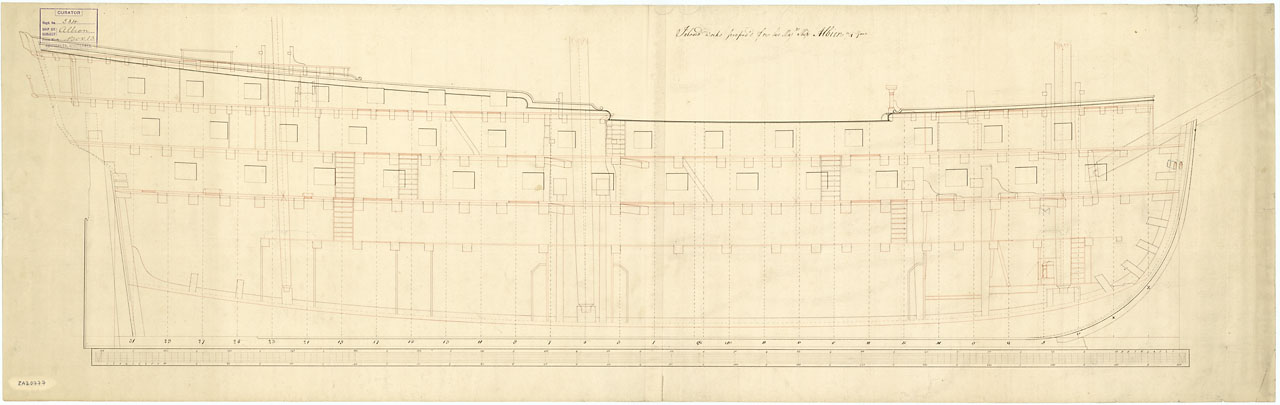
- Ship plan of Albion

History

Great Britain
- Name: HMS Albion
- Ordered: 1 December 1759
- Builder: Deptford Dockyard
- Launched: 16 May 1763
- Honours and awards: Participated in: Battle of Grenada; Battle of Martinique
- Fate: Wrecked April 1797

General characteristics
- Class & type: Albion-class ship of the line
- Tons burthen: 1662 (bm)
- Length: 168 ft (51 m) (gundeck)
- Depth of hold: 18 ft 10 in (5.74 m)
- Propulsion: Sails
- Sail plan: Full-rigged ship
- Armament: Gundeck: 28 × 32-pounder guns; Upper gundeck: 28 × 18-pounder guns; QD: 14 × 9-pounder guns; Fc: 4 × 9-pounder guns

HMS Albion was a 74-gun third-rate ship of the line of the Royal Navy. She was built by Adam Hayes at Deptford Dockyard and launched on 16 May 1763, having been adapted from a design of the old 90-gun ship Neptune which had been built in 1730. She was the first ship to be called HMS Albion. She was the first of a series of ships built to the same lines, which became known as the Albion-class ship of the line.

She saw her first action in the American War of Independence in July 1779 at the indecisive Battle of Grenada, when the British Fleet under the command of Vice Admiral Byron managed to avoid defeat from superior French forces.

Albion's next action was a year later on 17 April 1780, when British and French fleets met in the Battle of Martinique. A month later, on 15 May, the fleets met again and after a few days of manoeuvring the head of the British line confronted the rear-most French warships. Albion, leading the vanguard of the British fleet suffered heavy casualties, but with little to show for it. Just four days later the two fleets clashed for the third time but again it was indecisive with Albion heavily engaged as before, suffering numerous casualties in the process.

In 1794 Albion was consigned to the role of a 60-gun floating battery armed with heavy carronades and moored on the Thames Estuary. She was positioned in the Middle Swin, seven miles north-east of Foulness Point.

== Fate ==
In April 1797, while heading to a new position in the Swin Channel, off Maplin Sands and Foulness she ran aground due to pilot error. Two days later, during salvage efforts, her back broke, and she was completely wrecked. HMS Astraea rescued Captain Henry Savage and his crew. The crew later transferred to the newly built HMS Lancaster.

The subsequent court-martial blamed the pilots, William Springfield and Joseph Wright, for imprudent maneuvering and going too far back before altering course. The court ordered that they lose all pay due to them and they never serve as pilots again.

== Notable commanders ==
- Captain Samuel Barrington (1770–1773)
- Captain John Leveson-Gower (1773–1775)
- Captain George Bowyer (1778–1781)
