= John Josselyn (MP) =

16th-century English politician

John Josselyn or Jastleyn (ca. 1490 – 1553/54) was an English politician.

Josselyn was the third son of Ralph Josselyn of Hyde Hall, Sawbridgeworth, Hertfordshire and Catherine Martin of Faversham, Kent. Josselyn's father died in 1504, while his son was a minor. By 1532, he had married Anne Grenville of Wotton Underwood, Buckinghamshire. His wife was one of the gentlewomen of Catherine of Aragon. In 1545 and 1547, he was MP for Buckingham.

He left all his possessions to his daughter, Margaret Foxley née Josselyn.

Parliament of England
Unknown	Member of Parliament for Buckingham; 1545; With: Ralph Gifford	Succeeded by Henry Carey, 1st Baron Hunsdon
Preceded by Ralph Gifford	Member of Parliament for Buckingham; 1547; With: Henry Carey, 1st Baron Hunsdon	Succeeded by Edward Chamberlain with Francis Verney
