= Ralph Gifford =

16th-century English politician

Ralph Gifford (by 1504 – 1555/56), of Middle Claydon and Steeple Claydon, Buckinghamshire, was an English politician.

== Family ==
Gifford was the brother of George Gifford. He married Mary Chamberlain, the daughter of MP for Wallingford, Edward Chamberlain. They had at least one son, the MP for Old Sarum, Roger Gifford.

== Career ==
He was a Member (MP) of the Parliament of England for Buckingham in 1545.

Parliament of England
Preceded by ? ?	Member of Parliament for Buckingham; 1545; With: John Josselyn	Succeeded by Henry Carey, 1st Baron Hunsdon; John Josselyn
