= Sir Peter Temple, 2nd Baronet =

English politician

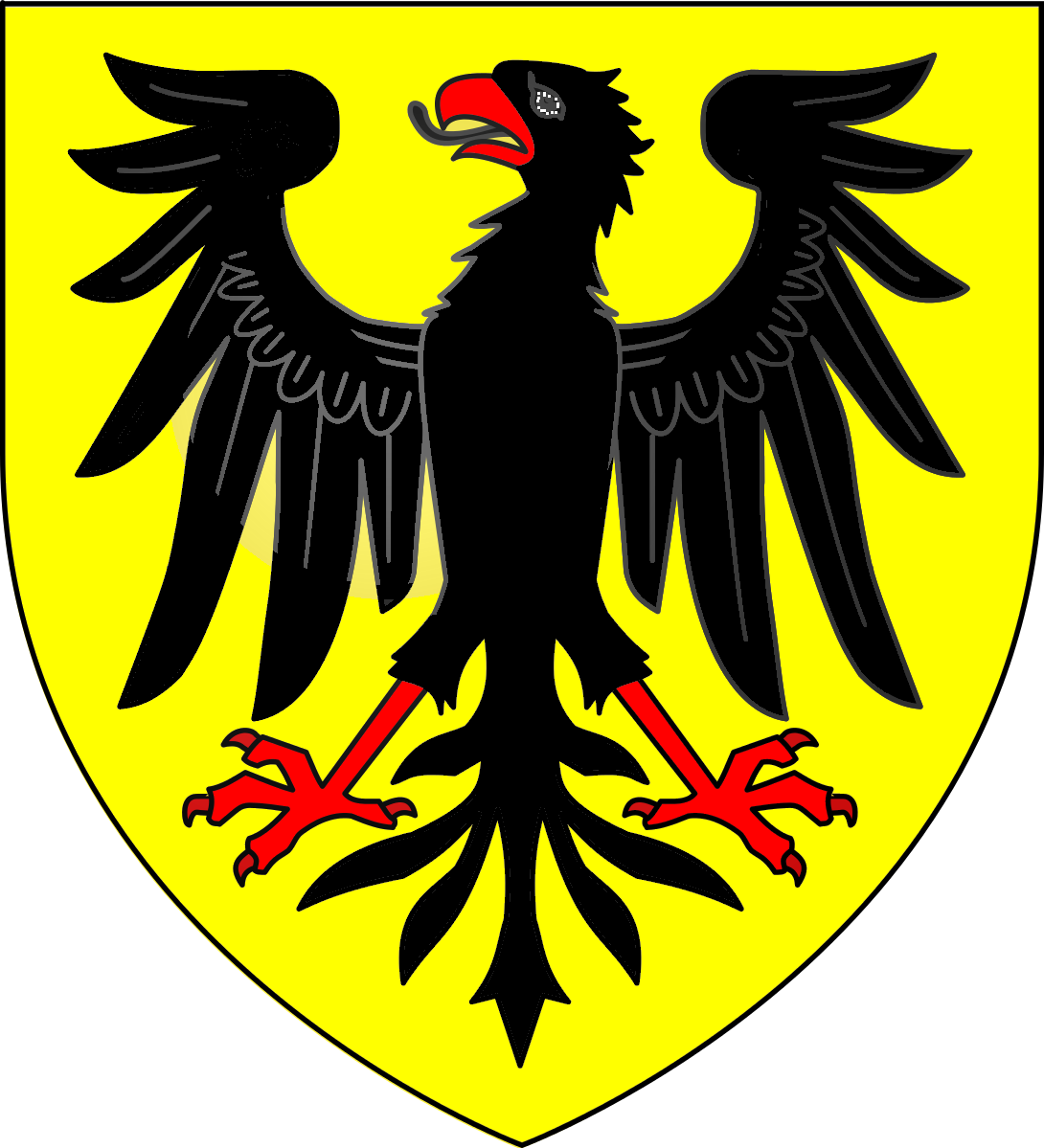
Arms of Temple of Stowe: Or, an eagle displayed sable

Sir Peter Temple, 2nd Baronet (15 October 1592 – 12 September 1653) was an English politician who sat in the House of Commons from 1640 to 1653. He was a Parliamentarian in the English Civil War.

== Family ==
Temple was the son of Sir Thomas Temple, 1st Baronet, of Stowe and his wife Hester Sandys, daughter of Miles Sandys. He inherited the baronetcy on his father's death in 1637.

Temple married firstly Ann Throckmorton, daughter of Sir Arthur Throckmorton of Paulerspury, Northamptonshire. He had two daughters by his first wife; the elder, Anne, survived into old age while the younger, Martha, died as a toddler. He married secondly Christian Leveson daughter of Sir John Leveson and they had several children. the eldest, Frances, married Weston Ridgeway, 3rd Earl of Londonderry. Sir Peter's eldest son Richard Temple succeeded to the baronetcy.

Sir Peter had a longstanding quarrel with his daughter Anne, who married Thomas Roper, 2nd Roper Viscount Baltinglass, without her father's permission. Anne and her husband sued Sir Peter and his heir, Sir Richard, for her inheritance through her mother, Anne Throckmorton Temple.

== Public offices ==
In 1634, he served as High Sheriff of Buckinghamshire and was consequently responsible for collecting the controversial ship money in Buckinghamshire.

In April 1640, Temple was elected Member of Parliament for Buckingham in the Short Parliament. He was also elected for Buckingham in November 1640 to the Long Parliament. He took the side of the Parliamentarians and fought for them in the Civil War. although his wife, Christian, was a Royalist sympathiser. He was nominated to serve as a judge on the court that tried Charles I, but never attended any sessions.

== Relationship with father ==
Sir Peter was accused by his father of "wasting money in gambling, drinking, and other extravagances". He believed that his father favoured his younger brother, John, over him. In the 1620s, when his father was planning to sell some land in order to reduce his debts, Sir Peter, who was himself heavily in debt, went to the Court of Chancery to prevent the sale. Eventually, the legal case between father and son was settled in the 1630s by an arbitrator. Sir Thomas was allowed to sell the land, but he had to make a payment to Sir Peter. Peter's father and mother, Sir Thomas Temple and Lady Hester Temple, had already made an agreement with Peter in 1625, whereby they vacated the mansion at Stowe by Buckingham, Buckinghamshire, and left Sir Peter to housekeep there. Peter made considerable changes to the building. From 1637 to 1643 Temple lived at No. 2-3 Tavistock Row, Covent Garden.

Parliament of England
Vacant Parliament suspended since 1629	Member of Parliament for Buckingham; 1640–1653; With: Sir Alexander Denton; John Dormer	Not represented in Barebones Parliament
Baronetage of England
Preceded by Thomas Temple	Baronet (of Stowe); 1637–1653	Succeeded by Richard Temple
