= Sir Thomas Smyth, 2nd Baronet =

British soldier and politician in Ireland

Brigadier-General Sir Thomas Smyth Bt
- Died: 20 June 1732 Dublin, Ireland

Sir Thomas Smyth, 2nd Baronet (after 1657 – 20 June 1732) was a soldier of the British Army.

He was the second and youngest, but only surviving son of Sir William Smyth, 1st Baronet, of Redcliff in Buckinghamshire, by his second wife, a daughter of the Master in Chancery Sir Nathaniel Hobart. He inherited the baronetcy in 1697.

Smyth was granted a commission as exempt and captain in the 2nd Troop of Horse Guards on 22 February 1690. He was promoted to guidon and major on 1 May 1693 and served in Flanders. On 1 February 1695 or 1696 he was appointed lieutenant and lieutenant-colonel of the 2nd Troop and his commission was renewed on the accession of Queen Anne. On 9 March 1702 he was granted brevet rank as colonel of Horse, and on 17 April 1702 he was made Quartermaster-General of the forces sent under the Duke of Ormonde to attack Cadiz. He was promoted to brigadier-general on 1 January 1707 and retired from the Army in 1709.

He was a Member of the Irish Parliament for Kilkenny City from 1703 to 1713 and for Duleek from 1713 to 1715. He also served as Ranger of the Park, Dublin, and died there on 20 June 1732. He was unmarried and the baronetcy became extinct on his death.

Parliament of Ireland
Preceded by Robert Curtis; Charles Wallis	Member of Parliament for Duleek with William Berry; 1713–1715	Succeeded by Thomas Trotter (did not sit); Francis Harrison (did not sit)
Preceded by No representation	Member of Parliament for Kilkenny with Standish Hartstonge 1703–1705; Viscount Tunbridge 1705–1711; Sir Redmond Everard, Bt 1711–1713; 1703–1713	Succeeded by Sir Richard Levinge, Bt; Darby Egan (did not sit)
Baronetage of England
Preceded by William Smyth	Baronet (of Redcliff); 1697–1732	Extinct
