= 1937 Buckingham by-election =

By-election

The 1937 Buckingham by-election was a by-election held on 11 June 1937 for the British House of Commons constituency of Buckingham in Buckinghamshire.

== Vacancy ==
The by-election was caused by the elevation to peerage of the town's Conservative Party Member of Parliament (MP) George Bowyer, who was ennobled as Baron Denham.

== Candidates ==
The Liberal Party selected Edwin James Boyce. He had been headmaster at Wolverton County Secondary School. He had been Chairman of the constituency Liberal association and had been elected as the association's President. He was an executive member of the Home Counties Liberal Federation.

== Result ==
The result was a victory for the Conservative candidate John Whiteley, who was elected with a majority of over 5,000 votes. Whiteley died in office six years later, triggering another by-election.

Buckingham by-election, 1937
Party	Candidate	Votes	%	±%
Conservative	John Whiteley	17,919	52.6	−5.4
Labour	James Delahaye	12,820	37.6	−4.4
Liberal	Edwin James Boyce	3,348	9.8	New
Majority		5,099	15.0	−1.0
Turnout		34,087	71.4	−3.7
Conservative hold		Swing		

== See also ==
- List of United Kingdom by-elections
- Buckingham constituency
- 1943 Buckingham by-election

== Bibliography ==
- Craig, F. W. S. (1983) [1969]. British parliamentary election results 1918-1949 (3rd ed.). Chichester: Parliamentary Research Services. ISBN 0-900178-06-X.
- Leigh Rayment's Historical List of MPs
