= Edward Lloyd (16th-century MP) =

English politician

Edward Lloyd (by 1508 – 1547) was an English politician.

Lloyd was an MP for Buckingham in 1529. He was a yeoman of the wardrobe to Anne Boleyn. In 1545, he was a member of the household of Katherine Parr, the sixth wife of Henry VIII. There is confusion in identifying Lloyd, and his surname may have been Sooll, Powell or Floyd.

He had a daughter named Joan, who was his heiress.

Parliament of England
Unknown	Member of Parliament for Buckingham; 1529; With: John Hasilwood	Succeeded by Thomas Pope with George Gifford
