= Sir George Bowyer, 6th Baronet =

British politician

The Right Honourable Sir George Bowyer, Bt KStJ, GCSG, KCPO

Member of Parliament for Abingdon
- In office 1811–1818
- Preceded by: Henry Bowyer
- Succeeded by: John Maberly

Member of Parliament for Malmesbury
- In office 1807–1810 Serving with Philip Gell
- Preceded by: Robert Ladbroke; Nicholas Ridley-Colborne
- Succeeded by: Abel Smith; Philip Gell

Personal details
- Born: 3 March 1783 Radley Hall, Berkshire
- Died: 1 July 1860 (aged 77) Dresden, Germany
- Spouse: Anne Hammond Douglas (after 1808)
- Relations: Piercy Brett (grandfather)
- Children: 4
- Parent(s): Sir George Bowyer, 5th Baronet; Henrietta Brett
- Education: Christ Church, Oxford

Sir George Bowyer, 6th and 2nd Baronet (3 March 1783 – 1 July 1860), was a British politician. He sat in the House of Commons in two periods between 1807 and 1818, first as a Tory and then as a Whig.

== Early life ==
He was the son of Admiral Sir George Bowyer, 5th Baronet, and his second wife Henrietta Brett, daughter of Admiral Sir Piercy Brett, and was born at Radley Hall in Berkshire.

In 1800, he succeeded his father as baronet. Bowyer was educated at Christ Church, Oxford, where he graduated with a Bachelor of Arts degree in 1804 and a Master of Arts in 1807.

== Career ==
He was commissioned as a captain in the Berkshire Militia on 16 May 1803, but resigned on 13 March 1804.

At the 1807 general election, Bowyer was elected in the Tory interest as a Member of Parliament (MP) for Malmesbury, a seat which he held until his resignation in 1810 by appointment as Steward of the Manor of East Hendred.

He returned to Parliament the following year as a Whig, when he was elected at an unopposed by-election in June 1811 as the MP for Abingdon, following the resignation of Henry Bowyer. He was re-elected in 1812, defeating his Tory opponent by a margin of 112 votes to 11, and held the seat until the 1818 general election. In 1815, financial difficulties forced him to sell the contents of Radley Hall. As a consequence, he moved with his family to Italy, converting to Roman Catholicism in 1850.

== Personal life ==
On 19 November 1808, he married Anne Hammond Douglas, oldest daughter of Captain Sir Andrew Snape Douglas. They had three sons and a daughter.

Bowyer died at Dresden in Germany, but was buried at Radley. He was succeeded in both baronetcies successively by his sons George and William.

=== Honours ===
Bowyer was a Knight of the Venerable Order of Saint John (KStJ), a Knight Grand Cross of the Order of St. Gregory the Great (GCSG) and a Knight Commander of the Order of Pius IX (KCPO).

Parliament of the United Kingdom
Preceded by Robert Ladbroke; Nicholas Ridley-Colborne	Member of Parliament for Malmesbury; 1807–1810; With: Philip Gell	Succeeded by Abel Smith; Philip Gell
Preceded by Henry Bowyer	Member of Parliament for Abingdon; 1811–1818	Succeeded by John Maberly
Baronetage of England
Preceded by George Bowyer	Baronet of Denham; 1799–1860	Succeeded by George Bowyer
Baronetage of Great Britain
Preceded by George Bowyer	Baronet of Radley; 1799–1860	Succeeded by George Bowyer
