= George Bowyer, 1st Baron Denham =

British politician (1886–1948)

The Right Honourable The Lord Denham MC DL
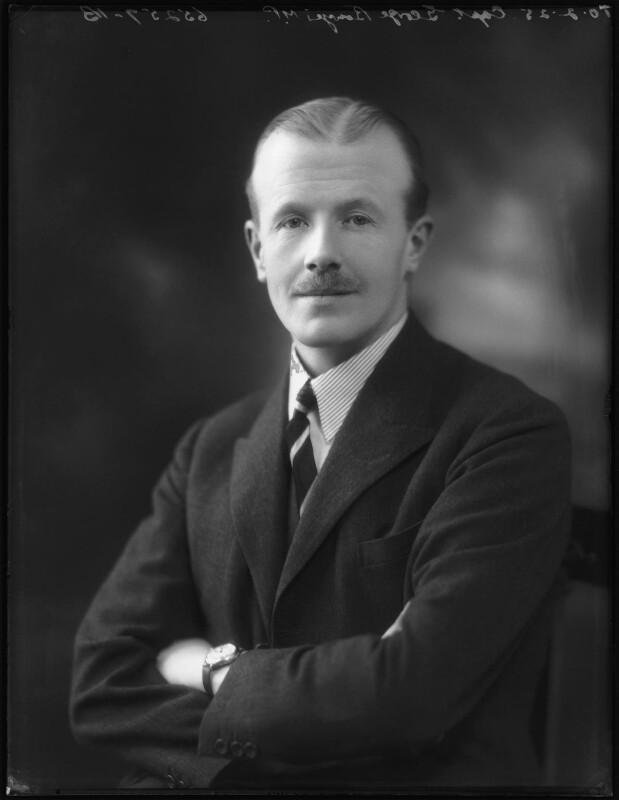

Comptroller of the Household
- In office 21 June 1935 – 6 December 1935
- Prime Minister: Stanley Baldwin
- Preceded by: Victor Warrender
- Succeeded by: Sir Lambert Ward

Member of Parliament for Buckingham
- In office 14 December 1918 – 11 June 1937
- Preceded by: Sir Harry Verney
- Succeeded by: John Whiteley

Member of the House of Lords
- Lord Temporal
- as a hereditary peer 11 June 1937 – 30 November 1948
- Preceded by: Peerage created
- Succeeded by: The 2nd Baron Denham

Personal details
- Born: 16 January 1886
- Died: 30 November 1948 (aged 62)
- Party: Conservative

George Edward Wentworth Bowyer, 1st Baron Denham (16 January 1886 – 30 November 1948), was a British Conservative Party politician.

== Career ==
Bowyer was educated at Eton and New College, Oxford, and was called to the bar in 1910. During World War I he served in the Oxfordshire and Buckinghamshire Light Infantry, achieved the rank of captain, and was awarded the Military Cross in the 1917 New Year Honours.

He was active in local government and was president of the Urban District Councils Association. At the 1918 general election he was elected as Member of Parliament (MP) for Buckingham. He served as a whip for many years. He was vice-chair of the Conservative Party and became Comptroller of the Household in 1935.

Bowyer was knighted in 1929 and made a baronet, of Weston Underwood, Olney, Buckinghamshire, in 1933. He was appointed a deputy lieutenant of the county of Buckingham in 1931. In 1937 he was created Baron Denham, also of Weston Underwood, Olney, Buckinghamshire.

He was elected as Senior Steward of the National Greyhound Racing Club and was the guest of honour when Oxford Stadium opened in 1939.

== Personal life ==
Bowyer married the Hon. Daphne Freeman-Mitford, daughter of Bertram Freeman-Mitford, 1st Baron Redesdale, on 27 February 1919. They had three children:

- Hon. Richard Laurence Grenville Bowyer (17 February 1920 – 29 January 1943), killed in action during World War II
- Hon. Peggy Bowyer (18 May 1925 – 17 February 2024), married David Repard (1921–2011), Royal Navy officer
- Hon. Bertram Stanley Mitford Bowyer, known as "Bertie", later the 2nd Baron Denham (3 October 1927 – 1 December 2021)

== Arms ==
Coat of arms of George Bowyer, 1st Baron Denham
| Crest A falcon rising belled Or. Escutcheon Or a bend Vaire cottised Sable. Supporters Dexter a golden retriever sinister a black greyhound Proper each charged on the shoulder with a portcullis Or. |

Parliament of the United Kingdom
| Preceded by Sir Harry Verney | Member of Parliament for Buckingham; 1918–1937 | Succeeded by John Whiteley |
Political offices
| Preceded by Sir Victor Warrender, 8th Bt | Comptroller of the Household; 1935 | Succeeded by Sir Lambert Ward |
Peerage of the United Kingdom
| New creation | Baron Denham; 1937–1948; Member of the House of Lords (1937–1948) | Succeeded by Bertram Bowyer |
Baronetage of the United Kingdom
| New creation | Baronet of Weston Underwood; 1933–1948 | Succeeded by Bertram Bowyer |
