= Baron Denham =

Title in the Peerage of the United Kingdom

Baron Denham, of Weston Underwood in the County of Buckingham, is a title in the Peerage of the United Kingdom. It was created in 1937 for Sir George Bowyer, 1st Baronet, a Conservative politician who had earlier represented Buckingham in the House of Commons. He had already been created a baronet, of Weston Underwood, in 1933. Bowyer was a great-great-great-grandson of Sir William Bowyer, 3rd Baronet, of Denham Court, through his fifth son (see title succession chart below).

The 1st Baron was succeeded in both titles by his second but only surviving son in 1948, who in 1950 also succeeded a distant relative in the older baronetcy, that of Denham Court. Like his father, the 2nd Baron Denham was a Conservative politician; he was one of the ninety elected hereditary peers that remained in the House of Lords after the passing of the House of Lords Act 1999.

As of 2025 the titles are held by his first son, the 3rd Baron, who succeeded in 2021.

The Bowyer baronetcy, of Denham Court in the County of Buckingham, was created in the Baronetage of England in 1660 for William Bowyer, a lawyer and a Royalist. He represented Buckinghamshire in the House of Commons.

His great-great-grandson Sir George Bowyer, third son of the 3rd Baronet, was an Admiral in the Royal Navy and distinguished himself at the battle of the Glorious First of June in 1794 (in which he lost a leg). For this he was created a baronet, of Radley in the County of Berkshire, in his own right. In 1799, he also succeeded his eldest brother, the 4th Baronet, in the baronetcy of Denham Court, thus becoming the 5th and 1st Baronet.

His son, the 6th and 2nd Baronet, sat as Member of Parliament for Malmesbury and Abingdon. He was succeeded by his son, the 7th and 3rd Baronet, who represented Dundalk and County Wexford in Parliament as a Liberal. On the death in 1950 of his nephew, the 9th and 5th Baronet, the baronetcy of Radley became extinct, but the baronetcy of Denham Court was inherited by his distant relative, the aforementioned 2nd Baron Denham, 2nd Baronet, of Weston Underwood, who thus also became the 10th Baronet. The titles remain united.

The family seat is The Laundry Cottage, near Weston Underwood, Buckinghamshire.

== Bowyer baronets, of Denham Court (1660) ==
- Sir William Bowyer, 1st Baronet (1612–1679)
- Sir William Bowyer, 2nd Baronet (1639–1722)
- Sir William Bowyer, 3rd Baronet (1710–1767)
- Sir William Bowyer, 4th Baronet (1736–1799)
- Sir George Bowyer, 5th and 1st Baronet (1740–1800, himself created a baronet, of Radley, in 1794)
- Sir George Bowyer, 6th and 2nd Baronet (1783–1860)
- Sir George Bowyer, 7th and 3rd Baronet (1811–1883)
- Sir William Bowyer, 8th and 4th Baronet (1812–1893)
- Sir George Henry Bowyer, 9th and 5th Baronet (1870–1950)

The baronetcy of Radley became extinct with the death of the 9th/5th Baronet.
For further succession in the baronetcy of Denham Court, see Baron Denham (1937).

== Bowyer baronets, of Radley (1794) ==
- Sir George Bowyer, 5th and 1st Baronet (1740–1800, succeeded in the 1660 baronetcy when his brother died without issue in 1799)
- Sir George Bowyer, 6th and 2nd Baronet (1783–1860)
- Sir George Bowyer, 7th and 3rd Baronet (1811–1883)
- Sir William Bowyer, 8th and 4th Baronet (1812–1893)
- Sir George Henry Bowyer, 9th and 5th Baronet (1870–1950)

Baronetcy extinct.

== Bowyer baronets, of Weston Underwood (1933) ==
- Sir George Edward Wentworth Bowyer, 1st Baronet (1886–1948, created Baron Denham in 1937)

== Baron Denham (1937) ==
- George Edward Wentworth Bowyer, 1st Baron Denham, 1st Baronet (1886–1948)
- Bertram Stanley Mitford Bowyer, 2nd Baron Denham, 10th and 2nd Baronet (1927–2021)

Inherited the Bowyer baronetcy, of Denham Court, in 1950. Had previously succeeded as baronet, of Weston Underwood, and Baron Denham.

- Richard Grenville George Bowyer, 3rd Baron Denham, 11th and 3rd Baronet (born 1959)

The heir presumptive is his brother, the Hon. Henry Martin Mitford Bowyer (born 1963).
The heir presumptive's heir apparent is his only son, Edmund Hunter Mitford Bowyer (born 1997).

== Title succession chart ==
Title succession chart, Bowyer baronets (three creations) and Barons Denham.

Bowyer baronetcy of Denham Court
Sir William Bowyer; 1st Baronet; 1612–1679
Sir William Bowyer; 2nd Baronet; 1639–1722
William Bowyer	Cecil Bowyer; 1684–1720
Sir William Bowyer; 3rd Baronet c. 1710 – 1767
Bowyer baronetcy of Radley
Sir William Bowyer; 4th Baronet; 1736–1799	Cecil Bowyer died b. 1799	Sir George Bowyer; 5th and 1st Bt. 1740–1800	Maj. Gen. Henry Bowyer a. 1740 – ?	Richard Atkins-Bowyer died 1820
Sir George Bowyer; 6th and 2nd Bt. 1783–1860	Lt Col. William Bowyer; 1784–?	Henry Bowyer; 1786–1853	William Atkins-Bowyer; 1779–1844
Sir George Bowyer; 7th and 3rd Bt. 1811–1883	Sir William Bowyer; 8th and 4th Bt. 1812–1893	Henry Bowyer; 1813–1883	Rev. William Atkins-Bowyer; 1807–1872
Sir George Bowyer; 9th and 5th Bt. 1870–1950	Lt. Col. Wentworth Bowyer; 1850–?
Bowyer baronetcy of Radley extinct
Bowyer baronetcy of Denham Court inherited by the 2nd Baron Denham	Bowyer baronetcy of Weston Underwood; Baron Denham
George Bowyer; 1st Baron Denham; 1st Baronet; 1886–1948
Hon. Richard Bowyer; 1920–1943	Bertram Bowyer; 2nd Baron Denham; 10th and 2nd Bt. 1927–2021
Richard Bowyer; 3rd Baron Denham; 11th and 3rd Bt. born 1959	Hon. Henry Bowyer born 1963
Edmund Bowyer born 1997

== See also ==
There have been two more baronetcies created for the Bowyer family; both are extinct.

- Bowyer baronets of Leighthorne, Sussex (1627)
- Bowyer baronets of Knipersley, Staffordshire (1660)
