= Bowyer baronets =

There have been five baronetcies created for members of the Bowyer family, a political family in the UK: three in the Baronetage of England, one in the Baronetage of Great Britain and one in the Baronetage of the United Kingdom. Three of the titles are extinct while the remaining extant baronetcies have been united in one holder. The Bowyer baronets are all descended from Thomas Bowyer who late in the 14th century married Katherine de Knypersley of Knypersley Hall in Staffordshire.

- Bowyer baronets of Leighthorne, Sussex (1627)
- Bowyer baronets of Denham Court (1660): see Baron Denham
- Bowyer baronets of Knipersley, Staffordshire (1660)
- Bowyer baronets of Radley (1794): see Sir George Bowyer, 5th Baronet
- Bowyer baronets of Weston Underwood: see Baron Denham

== See also ==
- Bowyer-Smyth baronets
- Goring baronets
