= Sir John Chetwode, 4th Baronet =

British politician and baronet

Sir John Chetwode, 4th Baronet (11 May 1764 – 17 December 1845) was a British politician and baronet.

Born in Stockport, he was the only surviving son of Sir John Chetwode, 3rd Baronet and his wife Dorothy Bretland, third daughter of Thomas Bretland. In 1779, he succeeded his father as baronet.

He was commissioned as a captain in the Staffordshire Yeomanry when it was formed on 4 July 1794. He remained with the regoient until 1800, but apparently never commanded a Troop.

He entered the British House of Commons in 1815, sitting for Newcastle-under-Lyme until 1818. He represented Buckingham as Member of Parliament (MP) from 1841 until his death in 1845.

On 26 October 1785, he married firstly Lady Henrietta Grey, eldest daughter of George Grey, 5th Earl of Stamford in Dunham Massey. She died in 1826 and Chetwode married Elizabeth Bristow, daughter of John Bristow in 1827. He had seven daughters and eight sons by his first wife. Chetwode died, aged 82 at his residence in Bognor Regis and was buried in Mucklestone. He was succeeded in the baronetcy by his oldest son John.

Parliament of the United Kingdom
| Preceded by Earl Gower; Sir John Boughey | Member of Parliament for Newcastle-under-Lyme; 1815–1818; With: Sir John Boughey | Succeeded by William Shepherd Kinnersley; Robert Wilmot |
| Preceded by Sir Harry Verney; Sir Thomas Fremantle, Bt | Member of Parliament for Buckingham; 1841–1845; With: Sir Thomas Fremantle, Bt | Succeeded by John Hall; Sir Thomas Fremantle, Bt |
Baronetage of England
| Preceded by John Chetwode | Baronet (of Oakley); 1779–1845 | Succeeded by John Newdigate-Ludford-Chetwode |
