= Henry Bowyer =

British politician

Henry Bowyer (9 March 1786 – 18 October 1853) was a British politician.

Bowyer was the third son of Sir George Bowyer, 5th Baronet. He attended Eton College between 1799 and 1802 and graduated from Christ Church, Oxford, in 1805. He never married.

Having originally intended to be a priest, Bowyer was elected as the Member of Parliament (MP) for Abingdon at a by-election in December 1809, following the death of its incumbent member George Knapp. Bowyer stood in the election as a substitute candidate for his eldest brother, George Bowyer. His brother had infringed the Treating Act and had become vulnerable to a petition against him. He held the seat for less than two years until his resignation in June 1811 by appointment as Steward of the Chiltern Hundreds. Bowyer never spoke in parliament during his time in office. His brother George was subsequently elected in June 1811. Bowyer became the rector of Sunningwell in Berkshire from 1812 until his death in 1853.

Parliament of the United Kingdom
Preceded by George Knapp	Member of Parliament for Abingdon; 1810–1811	Succeeded by Sir George Bowyer, Bt
