= Bowyer baronets of Knipersley, Staffordshire (1660) =

Extinct baronetcy in the Baronetage of England

Bowyer baronets
- Bowyer baronets of Knipersley, Staffordshire
- Creation date: 1660
- Status: extinct
- Extinction date: 1702

The Bowyer baronetcy, of Knipersley in the County of Stafford, was created in the Baronetage of England in 1660 for John Bowyer. He sat as Member of Parliament for Staffordshire and Newcastle-under-Lyme. His elder son, the second Baronet, represented Warwick and Staffordshire in the House of Commons. His son, the third Baronet, died childless and was succeeded by his uncle, the fourth Baronet. On the latter's death in 1701 without surviving male issue the title became extinct.

== Bowyer baronets, of Knipersley, Staffordshire (1660) ==
- Sir John Bowyer, 1st Baronet (1623–1666)
- Sir John Bowyer, 2nd Baronet (1653–1691)
- Sir John Bowyer, 3rd Baronet (1672–1701)
- Sir William Bowyer, 4th Baronet (1654–1702)

== See also ==
- Bowyer baronets
