= William Walter (MP for Buckingham) =

William Walter (died 1555), of Horley, Oxfordshire, was an English Member of Parliament (MP).

He was a Member of the Parliament of England for Lichfield in October 1553.
