= 1943 Buckingham by-election =

UK by-election

The 1943 Buckingham by-election was a parliamentary by-election held on 4 April 1943 for the UK House of Commons constituency of Buckingham in Buckinghamshire.

The by-election was held to fill the vacancy caused when the town's 45-year-old Conservative Party Member of Parliament Brigadier John Whiteley was killed in a plane crash in Gibraltar, along with another Conservative member, Victor Cazalet, and General Sikorski, the leader of the Polish government-in-exile. Whiteley had held the seat since a by-election in 1937.

== Candidates ==
The Conservative Party nominated as its candidate, Lionel Berry, the deputy chairman of Kemsley Newspapers Ltd (owner of The Sunday Times and the Daily Record), and eldest son of the company's proprietor, Viscount Kemsley.

In accordance with an electoral truce between the parties in the wartime coalition government, neither the Liberal nor Labour parties nominated a candidate.

== Result ==
As the only candidate, Berry was returned unopposed.

Buckingham by-election, 1943
Party	Candidate	Votes	%	±%
Conservative	Lionel Berry	Unopposed	N/A	N/A
Conservative hold				

He held the seat for only two years, until his defeat at the 1945 general election.

== See also ==
- Lists of United Kingdom by-elections
- Buckingham constituency
- 1937 Buckingham by-election
