= Edward Gifford (MP) =

16th-century English politician

Edward Gifford (c. 1485–1556), of Wicken, Northamptonshire, was an English politician.

He was a member (MP) of the parliament of England for Buckingham in October 1553.
