= Sir George Bowyer, 5th Baronet =

Royal Navy officer and politician (1740–1800)

Admiral Sir George Bowyer Bt
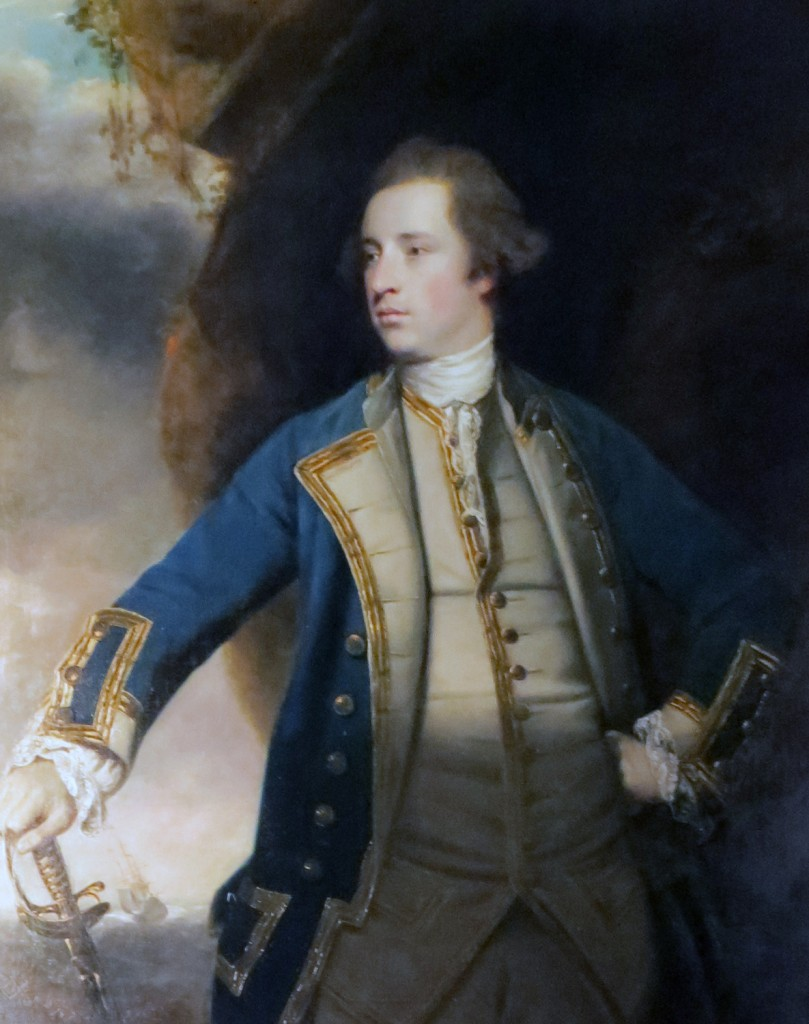
- Portrait by Sir Joshua Reynolds, c. 1768
- Born: 3 May 1740; Denham, Buckinghamshire
- Died: 6 December 1800 (aged 60); Radley Hall, Oxfordshire
- Military career
- Allegiance: Great Britain
- Branch: Royal Navy
- Service years: 1751–1800
- Rank: Admiral
- Commands: HMS Swift; HMS Sheerness; HMS Burford; HMS Albion; HMS Irresistible; HMS Bellona; HMS Boyne
- Conflicts: Seven Years' War; Battle of Minorca (1756); Raid on Rochefort; Siege of Louisbourg (1758); American War of Independence; Battle of Grenada; Battle of Martinique (1780); French Revolutionary Wars; Glorious First of June
- Awards: Naval Gold Medal

Admiral Sir George Bowyer, 5th and 1st Baronet (3 May 1740 – 6 December 1800) was a Royal Navy officer and politician of the eighteenth century. He participated in the Seven Years' War, fighting at the Battle of Minorca, raid on Rochefort, and siege of Louisbourg as a junior officer. Promoted to master and commander in 1761, his first command, the cutter HMS Swift, was captured by the French in June of the following year. Acquitted by his subsequent court-martial, Bowyer was promoted to post-captain in October 1762.

During the American War of Independence he commanded the ship of the line HMS Albion and fought in the Battle of Grenada and Battle of Martinique, and also played a key role in a skirmish with Admiral de Guichen's fleet on 15 May 1780 where he drew the fire of fifteen French ships at once. Promoted to rear admiral in 1793, Bowyer fought at the battle of the Glorious First of June on 1 June 1794 where he lost a leg. Unable to continue serving actively, he was rewarded for his service with a baronetcy and became an admiral in 1799. In the same year he also inherited his brother's baronetcy. Bowyer died in December 1800.

== Naval career ==
=== Early career ===
George Bowyer was baptised at Denham, Buckinghamshire, on 3 May 1740, the third son of Sir William Bowyer, 3rd Baronet, and his wife Anne, the daughter of Sir John Stonhouse, 3rd Baronet. Bowyer joined the Royal Navy as a captain's servant on board the frigate HMS Glory, commanded by Captain Richard Howe, on 11 May 1751. As a follower of Howe's he transferred with him to the brand new post ship HMS Dolphin on 16 July 1752. In Dolphin Bowyer served off the coast of West Africa, where in 1753 they investigated the martial intentions of the pirates of Sallee, on the Leeward Islands Station and in the Mediterranean Fleet before transferring to the ship of the line HMS Princess Louisa as a midshipman on 30 October 1755. He served in Princess Louisa during the Battle of Minorca on 20 May 1756.

Bowyer subsequently transferred to the ship of the line HMS Lancaster on 12 November and then to the ship of the line HMS Royal Anne on 20 April 1757 in which he took part in the Raid on Rochefort in September while serving in the English Channel. He passed his exam for lieutenant on 6 February 1758 and was promoted to that rank on 13 February and sent to the West Indies to serve on the ship of the line HMS Nottingham as her third lieutenant. As such he fought at the Siege of Louisbourg between 6 June and 27 July, before becoming the second lieutenant of Nottingham on 25 August. On 31 January 1760 he left Nottingham to re-join his mentor Howe on the ship of the line HMS Magnanime as her fourth lieutenant.

Bowyer was promoted to commander on 4 May 1761 and given as his first command the newly captured cutter HMS Swift, which had been the French privateer Le Comte de Valence. (Note: Winfield notes that upon commissioning Swift, Bowyer was still a lieutenant.) He patrolled off the southern coast of England until 30 June 1762 when Swift was attacked and captured by the French privateer Manley off Ushant. The French ship had been much larger than Bowyer's command, and at the subsequent court martial (held after the loss of any Royal Navy ship) he was acquitted, "having done everything in his power for escaping the enemy" before being captured.

=== Post-captain ===
Swift was Bowyer's only command as a commander because on 28 October 1762 he was promoted to post-captain. He was given command of the frigate HMS Sheerness at the same time and served in her in the Mediterranean until 17 December 1763 when he paid her off, the Seven Years' War having ended. Bowyer stayed unemployed until the outbreak of the American War of Independence in 1775, and on 31 October 1776 he was given command of the ship of the line HMS Burford in which he served off the coast of Ireland. He left Burford to recommission the ship of the line HMS Albion on 4 May 1778; on 9 June he sailed her to North America before travelling to the West Indies on 13 December as part of the fleet of Vice-Admiral John Byron. As part of the fleet Bowyer fought at the Battle of Grenada on 6 July 1779.

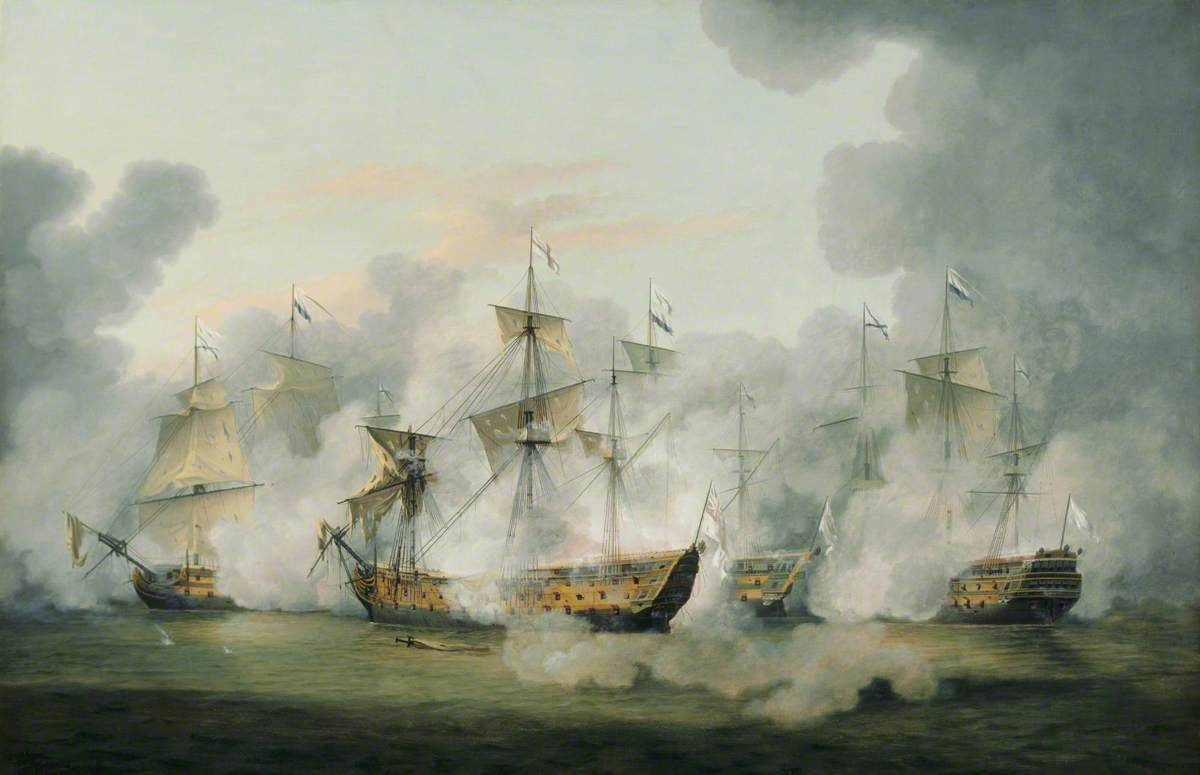
Painting of the Battle of Martinique

Having afterwards joined the fleet of Admiral Sir George Rodney in Albion, Bowyer fought in a number of actions against the French admiral Luc Urbain du Bouëxic, comte de Guichen. The first of these was the Battle of Martinique on 17 April 1780 where Rodney attempted to concentrate multiple ships against each French vessel; Bowyer understood this order but it was confused by many others and he was ordered away from attacking in the correct way by Rear-Admiral Hyde Parker. (Note: Rodney spoke harshly of Parker's decision, berating him that he did 'not permit two gallant officers [Bowyer and John Leigh Douglas of HMS Terrible] to do their duty'.) The battle ended indecisively. On 15 May the two fleets collided again after a fluke change in the wind allowed the French to cross the T in front of the British. Albion and Bowyer were sailing at the front of the British column and received the concentrated fire of fifteen French ships as they sailed towards them, eventually turning to run parallel along the French line with the rest of the fleet's vanguard. Bowyer took part in a similar action again on 19 May where the two fleets played a game of cat and mouse in an attempt to gain a strong tactical advantage.

Bowyer left the West Indies and returned to England on 24 December 1781, staying unemployed until 20 March 1783 when he was given command of the ship of the line HMS Irresistible in the Medway. Here the vessel served as a guardship, with Bowyer being made a commodore for the purpose. Bowyer left Irresistible and reverted to his rank as a post-captain on 22 June 1785, going on half pay. His next command came on 3 October 1787 when he recommissioned the ship of the line HMS Bellona but this commission was cut short and he paid her off on 7 December. Bowyer was appointed a Colonel of Marines, an honorary position for post-captains, on 24 September 1787 and received his next command, the brand new ship of the line HMS Boyne, at the beginning of the Spanish Armament on 18 August 1790. The crisis having abated, Bowyer left Boyne on 10 January 1791; she was his last command as a post-captain.

=== Flag rank ===
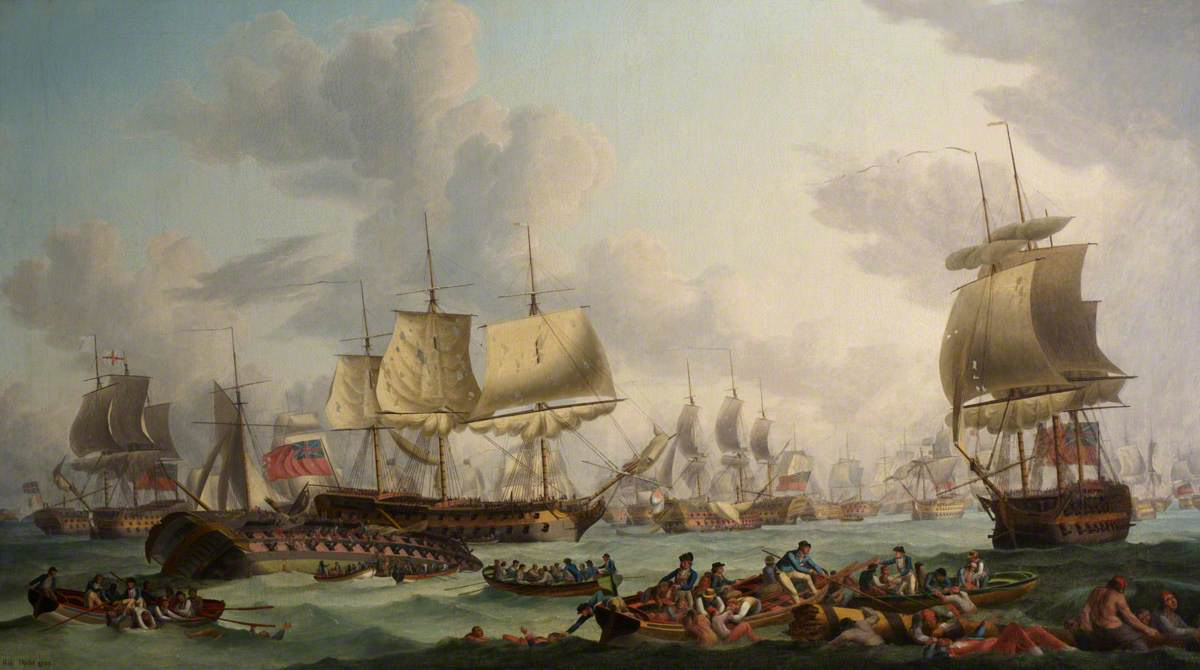
The Battle of the First of June by Robert Dodd

Bowyer was promoted to rear-admiral on 1 February 1793. He was sent to join the Channel Fleet under the now Admiral Howe, raising his flag in the ship of the line HMS Prince with Captain Cuthbert Collingwood as his flag captain, on 10 March. He transferred with Collingwood to the ship of the line HMS Barfleur when Prince was paid off in December 1793, staying in the Channel. (Note: From July 1793, Bowyer may have used the ship of the line HMS Brunswick as his flagship.) On 1 June 1794 the fleet fought the battle of the Glorious First of June, with Bowyer being heavily engaged with the French from 29 May. Bowyer commanded the first division of the centre of the fleet during the battle, having under his command Barfleur and the ships of the line HMS Invincible, HMS Arrogant, HMS Culloden, HMS Theseus, and HMS Gibraltar. At around 10 a.m. on 1 June itself Bowyer had his leg shot off by French fire, being caught by his flag captain as he fell. He was carried down to the ship's surgeon where the leg was amputated; Collingwood took over in his stead for the remainder of the battle. Bowyer officially left Barfleur in August.

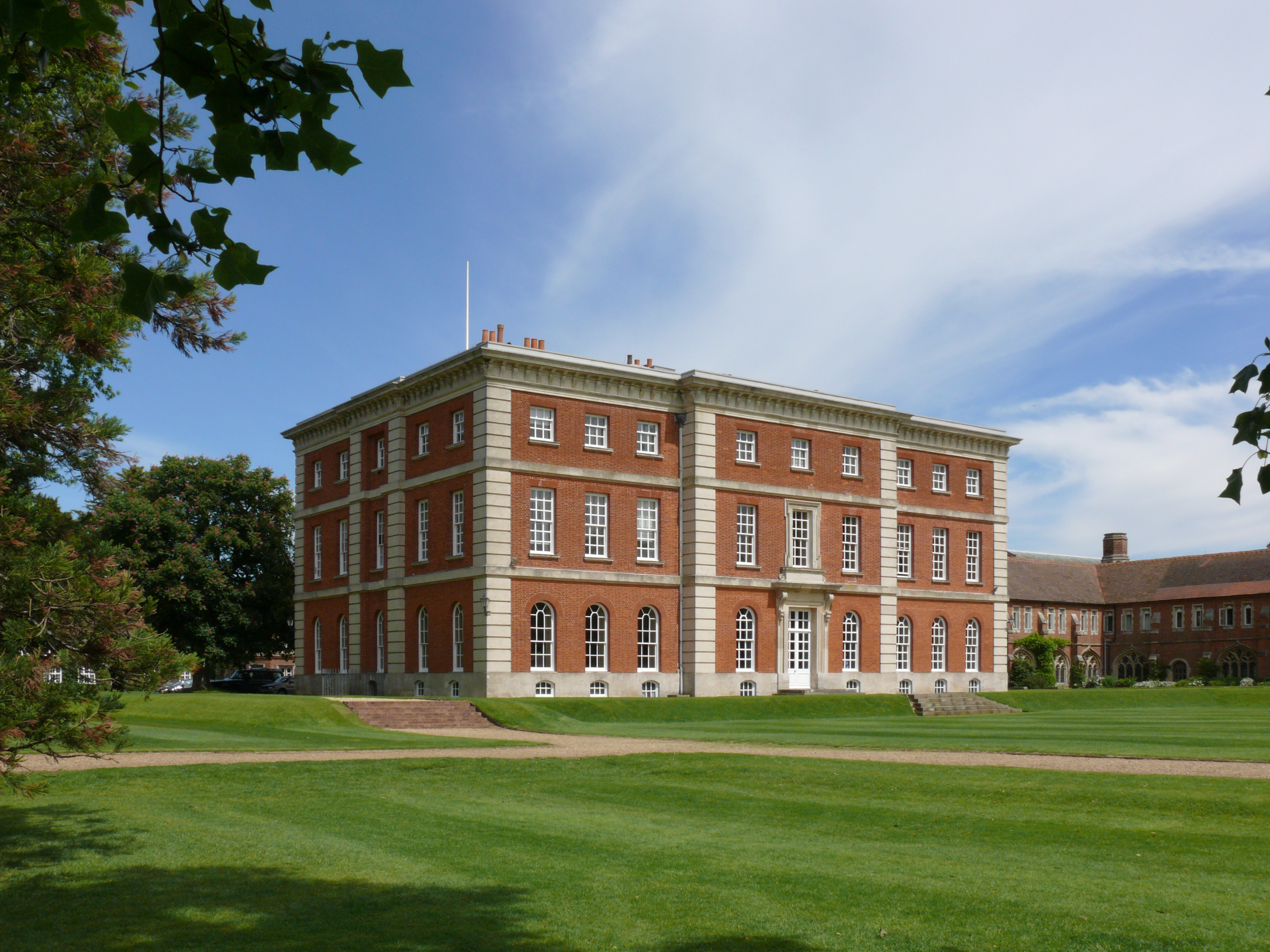
Radley Hall, now a part of Radley College

Bowyer was rewarded for his part in the victory, being made a baronet on 16 August and receiving a Naval Gold Medal. (Note: Collingwood did not receive a Naval Gold Medal for his part in the battle at the same time as his fellow officers; Bowyer unsuccessfully petitioned Lord Chatham, the First Lord of the Admiralty, on his behalf in October 1794.) Having lost his leg, for which he received a pension of £1,000 a year, Bowyer was no longer able to actively serve in the navy, but was promoted to vice-admiral on 4 July of the same year and to admiral on 14 February 1799. (Note: Full dates of flag rank: Rear-admiral of the white 1 February 1793, rear-admiral of the red 12 April 1794, vice-admiral of the blue 4 July 1794, vice-admiral of the red 1 June 1795, admiral of the blue 14 February 1799.)

While already a baronet in his own right, Bowyer succeeded to the family baronetcy held by his brother William when the latter died in April. Having inherited Radley Hall from his uncle Sir James Stonhouse, 10th Baronet, in April 1792, Bowyer lived there until his death on 9 December 1800. (Note: Death also recorded as 6 December.) He was buried at the local parish church on 16 December.

== Political career ==
Bowyer became member of parliament for Queenborough in 1784. The Queenborough parliamentary seat was controlled by the Admiralty and he dedicated his political time to naval affairs while generally supporting William Pitt the Younger's faction. Bowyer made his maiden speech in parliament on 18 June defending the state of the navy and would go on to make nine other speeches, all related to the navy. He also joined the parliamentary committee considering the defences of Portsmouth and Plymouth in 1785 and on 18 April of that year voted in favour of Pitt's parliamentary reform bill focused on rotten boroughs. He gave up his seat in 1790.

== Family ==
Bowyer married Margaret Downing (née Price; died 1778), the widow of Sir Jacob Downing, 4th Baronet, on 11 November 1768. There were no children from the union. Again while in between commands, Bowyer married Henrietta Brett (1753–1845), the daughter of Admiral Sir Peircy Brett, on 4 June 1782. Together they had three sons and two daughters:

- Sir George Bowyer, 6th Baronet (6 March 1783 – 1 July 1860)
- Lieutenant Colonel William Bowyer (b. 29 December 1784), British Army officer who died serving in the West Indies
- Henry Bowyer (9 March 1786 – 18 October 1853), rector of St Michael and All Angels Church, Sunninghill
- Henrietta Sawyer, married Charles Sawyer in 1812
- Eliza Bowyer (1791 – 1 November 1879)

== Notes and citations ==
=== Citations ===
Parliament of Great Britain
Preceded by Sir Charles Frederick; Sir Walter Rawlinson	Member of Parliament for Queenborough; 1784–1790; With: John Clater Aldridge	Succeeded by Gibbs Crawfurd; Richard Hopkins
Baronetage of England
Preceded by William Bowyer	Baronet of Denham Court; 1799–1800	Succeeded by George Bowyer
Baronetage of Great Britain
New creation	Baronet of Radley; 1794–1800	Succeeded by George Bowyer
Preceded by Pasley baronets	Bowyer baronets of Radley; 8 September 1794	Succeeded by Gardner baronets
