= Bowyer baronets of Leighthorne, Sussex (1627) =

Extinct baronetcy in the Baronetage of England

Bowyer baronets
- Bowyer baronets of Leighthorne, Sussex
- Creation date: 1627
- Status: extinct
- Extinction date: 1678

The Bowyer baronetcy, of Leighthorne in the County of Sussex, was created in the Baronetage of England on 23 July 1627 for Thomas Bowyer. He represented Midhurst and Bramber in the House of Commons. On 18 May 1678 his younger son, the third Baronet, surrendered the title and was granted a new Baronetcy, of Highden in the County of Sussex, with remainder to Henry Goring and with the precedence of 23 July 1627. On Bowyer's death in 1680 the baronetcy of 1627 became extinct while he was succeeded in the 1678 creation by the aforementioned Henry Goring. For further history of this title, see Goring baronets.

== Bowyer baronets, of Leighthorne, Sussex (1627) ==
- Sir Thomas Bowyer, 1st Baronet (1586–1650)
- Sir Thomas Bowyer, 2nd Baronet (1609–1659)
- Sir James Bowyer, 3rd Baronet (1644–1680)

== See also ==
- Bowyer baronets
