= Edward Lloyd (cricketer) =

English schoolmaster and cricketer

Edward Wynell Mayow Lloyd (19 March 1845 – 27 September 1928) was an English schoolmaster and a cricketer who played first-class cricket for Cambridge University and the Marylebone Cricket Club (MCC) between 1866 and 1868. He was born at Benares, India and died at Hartford Bridge, Hartley Wintney, Hampshire.

Lloyd was educated at Rugby School and at St John's College, Cambridge. As a cricketer, he was a middle-order right-handed batsman, and he was tried for matches for Cambridge University in both 1866 and 1868 – in one of the 1868 games, he played for the MCC against the university side – but he achieved little and was not awarded a Blue. He continued to play in minor matches after leaving Cambridge and appeared for both the Shropshire and Somerset teams in non-first-class matches, including one game for Somerset in 1879 that is the basis of disputes about the cricket career statistics of W. G. Grace (see Variations in first-class cricket statistics). In one of these minor matches featuring many of the players who were instrumental in the setting up of Somerset County Cricket Club, Lloyd made an unbeaten 100 for the Gentlemen of Somerset against the Gentlemen of Dorset. At his only match for Shropshire, in 1868, he scored a century of 108 runs.

On leaving Cambridge, he became a schoolmaster at Marlborough College from 1868 to 1875 and was then the headmaster of a preparatory school, Hartford House School, at Hartley Wintney until his retirement in 1910. He died in 1928 aged 83. A brief obituary in The Times states that he was "one of the most successful private schoolmasters in the country" and that he achieved many scholarships at public schools, principally at Marlborough, for his pupils.
