= Alexander Denton (Royalist) =

English politician

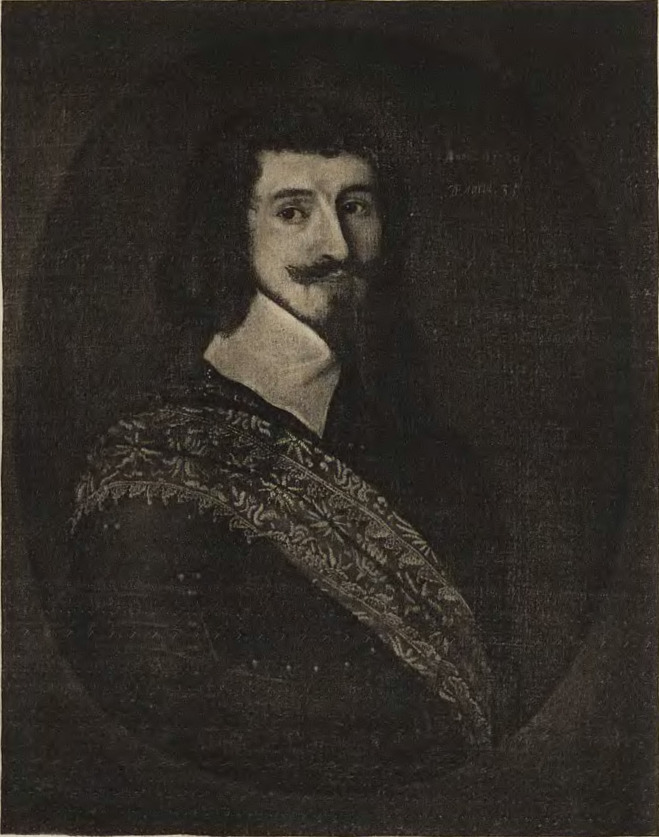
- Born: 21 March 1596
- Died: 1 January 1645 (aged 48)
- Spouse(s): Mary Hampden
- Children: Edmond Denton, of Hillesden
- Parent(s): Thomas Denton; Susan Temple
- Position held: Member of the 1625 Parliament, Member of the 1626 Parliament, Member of the April 1640 Parliament

Sir Alexander Denton (21 March 1596 – 1 January 1645) was an English politician who sat in the House of Commons variously between 1625 and 1644. He supported the Royalists during the English Civil War. He also has a house at a grammar school in Buckinghamshire (Royal Latin School)

== Early life ==
Denton was the eldest son of Sir Thomas Denton of Hillesden and his wife Susan Temple, daughter of John Temple of Stowe. He entered Christ Church, Oxford in 1612, was knighted in 1617 and inherited the manor of Barford Chesney in 1618. He further inherited Hillesden manor when he succeeded his father in 1633.

== Political career ==
He entered Parliament in 1624 as the Member of Parliament (MP) for Wendover. In the two parliaments of 1625 Denton was MP for Buckingham. He was re-elected MP for Buckingham in April 1640 for the Short Parliament and in November 1640 for the Long Parliament. He was appointed High Sheriff of Buckinghamshire for 1637–38.

Denton was a Royalist and his house at Hillesden became a focal point during the English Civil War. He was disabled from sitting in Parliament on 22 January 1644. In January 1644 Parliamentary forces occupied Hillesden House but they were ejected. In early February Colonel William Smith garrisoned Hillesden House with about 260 men to support the King at Oxford. The house was occupied at the time by many of the Denton family and some of the Verney family and Sir Alexander also arrived at the house by chance. A force of over 2000 men under Oliver Cromwell and Samuel Luke laid siege to the house at the beginning of March. After the surrender Smith and Denton were taken prisoner and moved to the Tower of London, while the house was destroyed and the family beggared.

Denton died a prisoner on New Year's Day 1645. He was buried at Hillesden on 5 January 1645.

== Personal life ==
Denton had married Mary Hampden, daughter of Edmund Hampden of Hertwell, and a cousin of John Hampden on 3 September 1617. They had five sons and eight daughters. At one time John Kersey the elder was tutor to the sons. The eldest son John Denton was killed at the Battle of Abingdon in 1644. Only Denton's second son, Edmund, had issue. Edmund's oldest son Alexander was a Member of Parliament (MP) representing Buckingham, from 1690 to 1698. Alexander (the grandson) had two sons, Sir Edmund and Alexander who also represented Buckingham. In addition, this Alexander's eldest daughter Elizabeth was the mother of George Chamberlayne Denton, who also represented Buckingham as a Member of Parliament (MP), from 1727 to 1734. George Chamberlayne Denton was the maternal grandfather of Thomas Coke, 1st Earl of Leicester.

Parliament of England
Preceded by Sir Edmund Verney; Richard Oliver	Member of Parliament for Buckingham; 1625–1626; With: Richard Oliver 1625; Sir John Smythe 1626	Succeeded by Sir Thomas Denton; Richard Oliver
Vacant Parliament suspended since 1629	Member of Parliament for Buckingham; 1640–1644; With: Sir Peter Temple	Succeeded by John Dormer; Sir Peter Temple
