= Edward Floyd (impeached barrister) =

Edward Floyd, Floud or Lloyd (died 1648) was an Englishman impeached and sentenced by the Parliament of England in 1621 for speaking disparagingly of Frederick V, Elector Palatine (by Floyd's Case).

== Early life ==
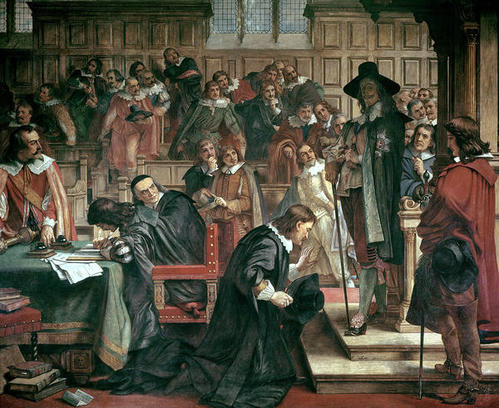
Victorian depiction of the old form of the House of Commons of England twenty years after Floyd badmouthed (libelled) Elizabeth of Bohemia while in the Fleet Prison.

Floyd was a Roman Catholic barrister. He became steward in Shropshire to Lord Chancellor Ellesmere and Thomas Howard, 1st Earl of Suffolk.

== Floyd's case ==
In 1621, when Floyd was in the Fleet Prison at the instance (doing) of the Privy Council, he was impeached by the House of Commons for having said:

I have heard that Prague is taken; and Goodman Palsgrave and Goodwife Palsgrave have taken their heels; and as I have heard, Goodwife Palsgrave is taken prisoner.

These words, it was alleged, he spoke in a scornful manner, to insult the Prince Palatine and his wife Elizabeth of Bohemia, who was daughter to James I of England. The case led to an important constitutional decision on which forums can hold criminal trials with a political dimension and what permission is needed from the Crown and any second House. Shortly before the case, the Commons had looked for precedents supporting their judicial role. They found none save as to contempt for (being in contempt of) the House. During the proceedings they demurred on this lack of precedent. They had to concede the point.

=== Case in the Commons ===
The case came to the House of Commons on 30 April. By then it had been in session since February. It had done nothing on the situation in Bohemia, where the Elector Palatine and his English princess wife had been heavily defeated in a conflict that formed the first phase of the Thirty Years War. On that day the influential parliamentarian Sir Edwin Sandys encouraged the Commons to take punitive action. The feeling of the House was that in this matter they could make their mark in foreign policy, not otherwise in their remit.

The Commons agreed on 1 May that Floyd should pay a fine of £1,000 (equivalent to £300,000 in 2023), stand in the pillory at three stands for two hours at each, and be carried from place to place on a horse without a saddle, with his face towards the horse's tail, and holding the tail in his hand. The king, however, objected to the Commons taking up the matter. The next morning he sent (an agent) to inquire upon what precedents the Commons grounded their claim to act as a judicial body in regard to offences which did not concern their privileges. He also pointed out that they had failed to get his approval, and had not granted Floyd due process. Sandys by now had thought better of direct judgement; he argued that as the Speaker had signed nothing, the decision of the Commons was not yet effective. The momentum of the House was against him. Sir Edward Coke pressed for enforcibility, invoking his favoured view of the Commons as court of record. William Noy warned against passing judgement relating to overseas matters.

Two days later the Commons petitioned the king to be allowed their sentence. He argued that it was quite unclear what jurisdiction they were claiming; but agreed to consider the petition and to act in the matter of Floyd. But on 4 May he sent the matter to the House of Lords - poorly timed as (as Sandys had already argued) the upper house was preoccupied with efforts to undermine George Villiers, 1st Duke of Buckingham.

=== The House of Lords intervenes ===
On 5 May the Commons and Lords conferred on the case. Coke worked to salvage the concept of the Commons as court of record, by having the prior record annulled as the lesser of two evils, since the king and Lords appeared set to deny the claim.

A debate of several days then led to a conference of the two houses, when it was agreed that the accused should be arraigned before the Lords, and that a declaration should be entered on the journals that his trial before the commons should not prejudice the just rights of either house.

=== Second sentence and its execution ===
The Lords added to the severity of the first judgment. On 26 May, Floyd was condemned to be degraded from the estate (state) of a gentleman; his testimony not to be received; he was to be branded, whipped at the cart's tail, fined £5,000, and imprisoned in Newgate Prison for life. When he was branded in Cheapside he declared that he would have given £1,000 to be hanged in order that he might be a martyr in so good a cause.

Some days later, on the motion of Prince Charles, it was agreed by the lords that the whipping should not be inflicted, and an order was made that in future judgment should not be pronounced, when the sentence was more than imprisonment, on the same day on which it was voted. The remainder of the sentence on Floyd seems to have resulted save that he was liberated on 16 July, after the new Lord Chancellor John Williams had prevailed with George Villiers, 1st Duke of Buckingham to recommend to James I an exercise of his prerogative of mercy in the case of political prisoners.

On the petition of Joane, his wife, the Lords on 6 December ordered his trunk and writings to be delivered up to her; the clerk first taking out Catholic books and religious objects.

== Evaluation and archive ==
Henry Hallam criticised the proceedings. Joseph Robson Tanner in 1930 wrote in examining the constitution that the English House of Commons had clearly exceeded their jurisdiction. Charles Howard McIlwain commented that the claim the House made for jurisdiction under parliamentary privilege was "the most extensive and the least justifiable, perhaps, in all parliamentary history; and the far-fetched arguments brought forward in debates in support of the claim are of great interest", citing the record in Thomas Barrington's diary of the parliament.

A collection, made by Sir Harbottle Grimstone, of the proceedings is kept as Harleian MS. 6274, art. 2.

== Notes ==
Attribution

This article incorporates text from a publication now in the public domain: Stephen, Leslie, ed. (1889). "Floyd, Edward". Dictionary of National Biography. Vol. 19. London: Smith, Elder & Co.
