= George Gifford (died 1557) =

English politician (died 1557)

George Gifford (by 1496–1557) was an English politician.

== Life ==
Gifford was the son of Roger Gifford of Middle Claydon by Mary, daughter of William Nansiglos of London and Redfans, Essex. He was brother of Ralph Gifford.

He married: Margaret Bardfield, who died in 1539, daughter and coheir of John Bardfield of Shenfield, Essex, and widow of Robert Gedge (d. 1528/31) of London. His second wife was Philippa Trappes, daughter of Robert Trappes of London, and widow of Edmund Shaa (d. Nov./Dec. 1539) of London. Despite remarrying after his death, Philippa asked to be buried next to Gifford.

== Career ==
Gifford studied at the Inner Temple. Gifford was put forward by Thomas Cromwell as MP for Buckingham; the previous MPs had been tainted by their association with Henry VIII's second wife, Anne Boleyn, who had just been executed for treason and adultery.

Gifford was Member of Parliament for Buckingham in 1536 and Buckinghamshire in April 1554. He was the Chamberlain of the Household of Anne of Cleves, the fifth wife of Henry VIII.
