= John Dormer (Parliamentarian) =

John Dormer (c. 1611 – 22 May 1679) was an English politician who sat in the House of Commons at various times between 1645 and 1660.

Dormer was the son of Sir Fleetwood Dormer, of Shipdon Leigh, Buckinghamshire and was baptised at Quainton, Buckinghamshire on 6 January 1612. He matriculated at Magdalen Hall, Oxford on 25 January 1628, aged 16 and was awarded B.A.on 23 February 1628 and M.A.on 8 June 1630. He was incorporated at Cambridge University and was awarded MA in 1632. He was admitted at Lincoln's Inn on 7 February 1629 and was called to the bar in 1636.

In May 1645, Dormer was elected Member of Parliament for Buckingham in the Long Parliament. He sat until 1653.

In 1660, Dormer was elected MP for Buckingham in the Convention Parliament.

Dormer was of Lee Grange, Buckinghamshire, and of Purston, Northamptonshire and died aged 68. His son John was created a baronet and his son Robert was also an MP.

Parliament of England
Preceded by Sir Alexander Denton; Sir Peter Temple	Member of Parliament for Buckingham; 1640–1653; With: Sir Peter Temple	Succeeded by Not represented in Barebones Parliament
