= 1891 Buckingham by-election =

UK Parliamentary by-election

The 1891 Buckingham by-election was held on 28 May 1891 after the expulsion of the incumbent Liberal MP, Edmund Verney, who had won in a by-election two years previously. The seat was retained by the Liberal candidate Herbert Samuel Leon. The Conservative candidate, Evelyn Hubbard was the younger brother of a previous MP and had stood in the 1889 by-election.

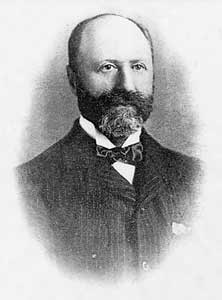
Leon

Buckingham by-election, 1891
Party	Candidate	Votes	%	±%
Liberal	Herbert Samuel Leon	5,018	51.7	
Conservative	Evelyn Hubbard	4,682	48.3	
Majority		336	3.4	
Turnout		9,700		
Liberal hold		Swing		
