= 1889 Buckingham by-election =

UK Parliamentary by-election

The 1889 Buckingham by-election was held on 11 October 1889 after the incumbent Conservative MP, Egerton Hubbard succeeded to a peerage as the second Baron Addington. The seat was won by the Liberal candidate Edmund Verney who would later be expelled causing a by-election in 1891. The Conservative candidate, Evelyn Hubbard was the younger brother of the outgoing MP.

Buckingham by-election, 1889 Electorate
Party	Candidate	Votes	%	±%
Liberal	Edmund Verney	4,856	51.1	+1.5
Conservative	Evelyn Hubbard	4,647	48.9	−1.5
Majority		209	2.2	N/A
Turnout		9,503	75.6	−2.7
Liberal gain from Conservative		Swing	+1.5	
