= Other Windsor, 6th Earl of Plymouth =

English noble (1789-1833)

Other Archer Windsor
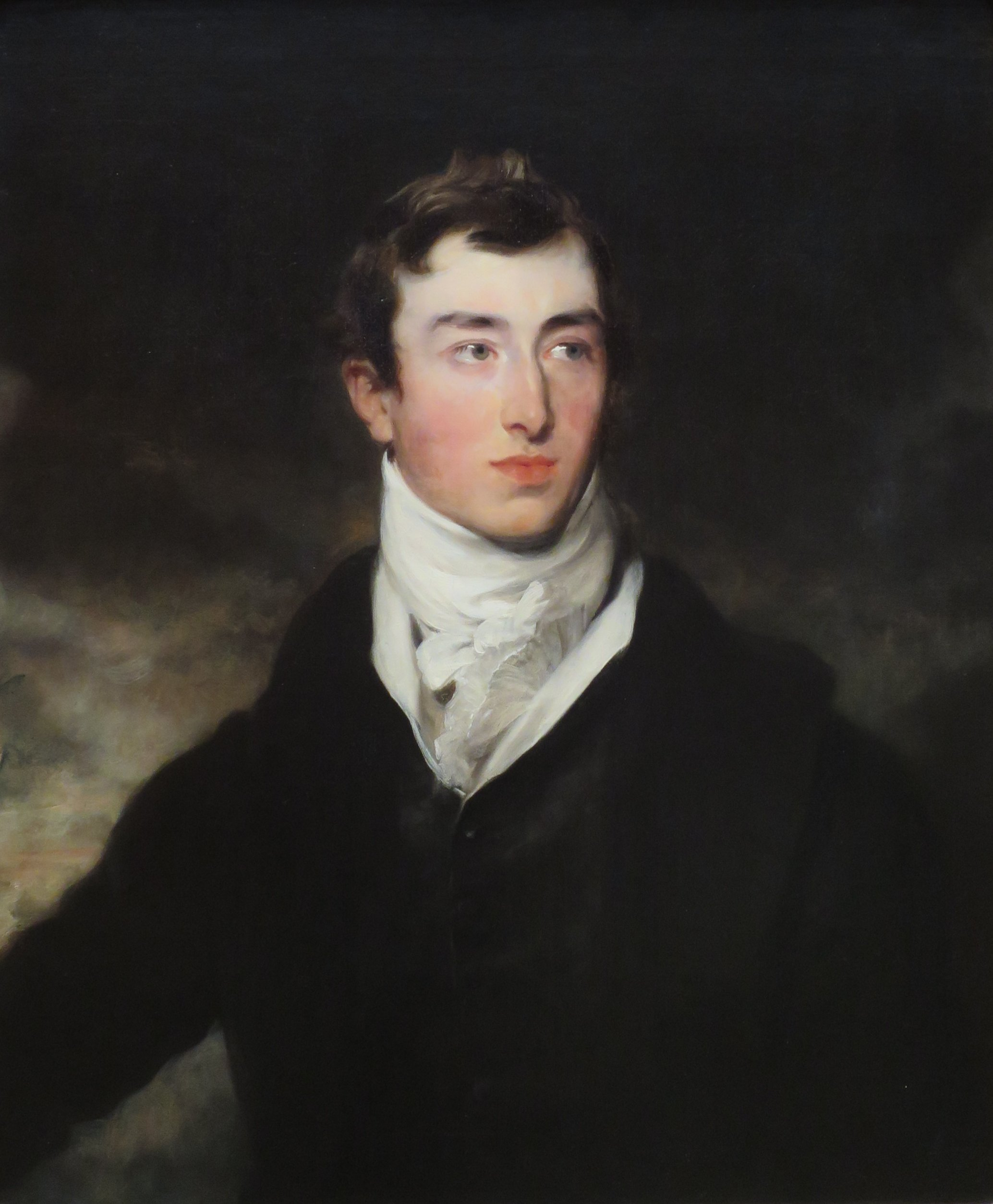
- Portrait of Other Archer, Earl of Plymouth by Thomas Lawrence
- Born: 2 July 1789
- Died: 20 July 1833 (aged 44); Deptford, London
- Resting place: St Bartholomew's Church, Tardebigge, Worcestershire
- Spouse: Lady Mary Sackville (m. 1811)
- Parents: 5th Earl of Plymouth (father); Sarah Archer (mother)
- Relatives: Andrew Archer (maternal grandfather); Harriet Windsor (sister); Sarah Amherst (half-sister); William Amherst (half-brother)

Other Archer Windsor, 6th Earl of Plymouth (2 July 1789 – 20 July 1833) was an English nobleman, the eldest and only surviving son of the 5th Earl of Plymouth. He was the sixth Earl of Plymouth of the 1682 creation.

== Family ==
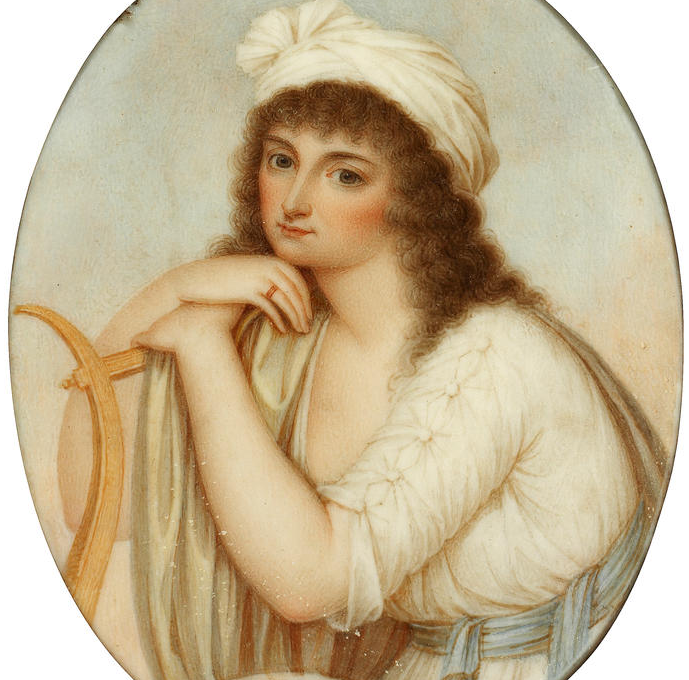
The earl's mother, Hon. Sarah Archer (1762–1838), Countess of Plymouth & Countess Amherst of Arracan, after Andrew Plimer.

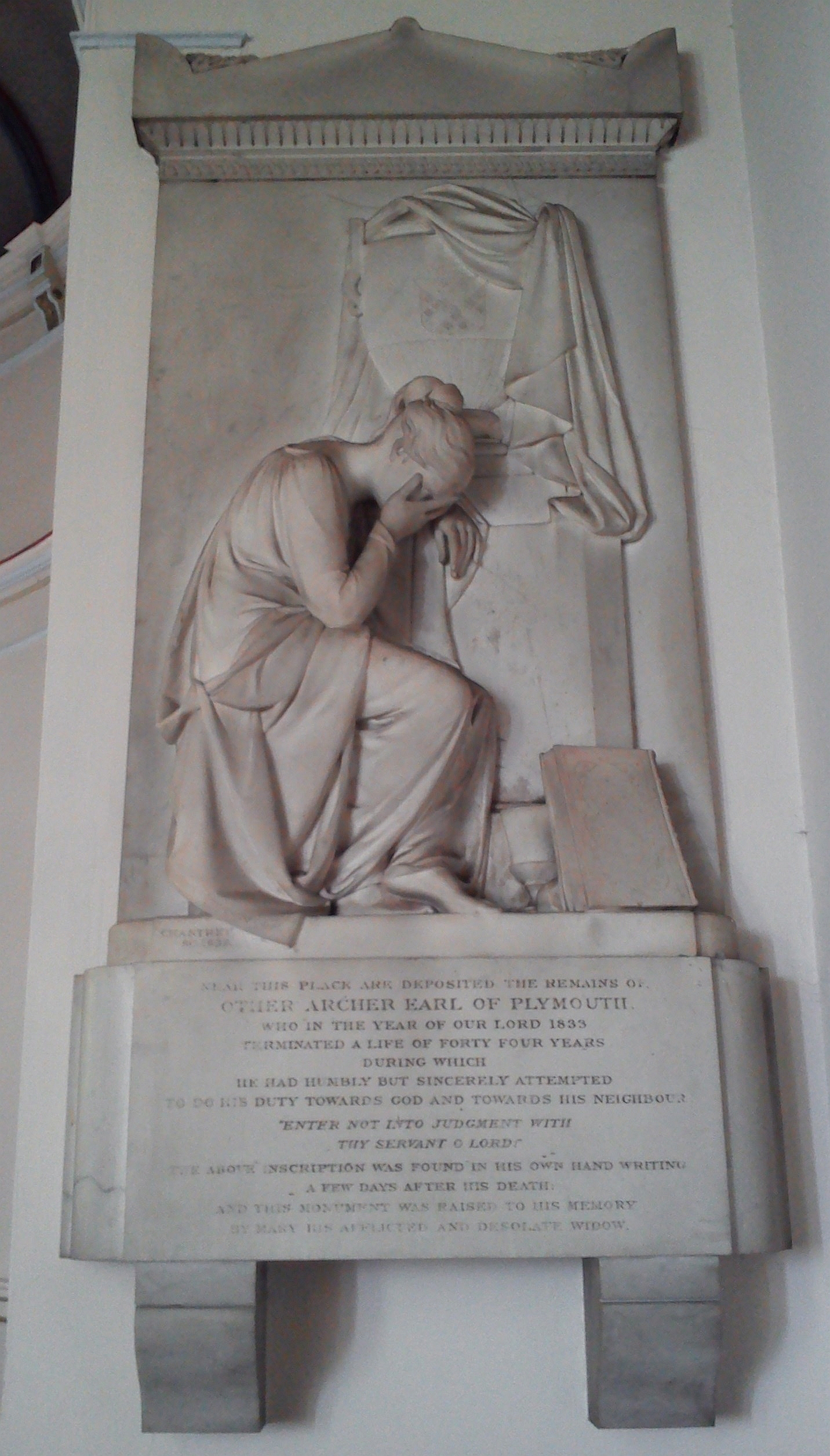
Memorial to the 6th Earl of Plymouth at St Bartholomew's Church, Tardebigge by Francis Chantrey

Other was the only son of Other Windsor, 5th Earl of Plymouth by his wife and cousin, Hon. Sarah Archer, daughter and eventual co-heiress of the 2nd Baron Archer. His unusual forename 'Other' is traditional in the family and derives from a legendary Viking ancestor 'Othorere' in the time of Alfred the Great.

He had two sisters: Lady Mary Windsor, who married the Marquess of Downshire and Lady Harriet Windsor, who married the Hon. Robert Clive, a son of the Earl of Powis and grandson of Clive of India.

Styled Lord Windsor from birth, he inherited his titles from his father on 12 June 1799 at the age of ten, along with his father's land at Tardebigge, the country seat Hewell Grange, and land in Shropshire and Glamorgan. A year later (1800), his mother married Lord Amherst as his first wife, and bore him two sons. It is not clear if young Plymouth grew up with his stepfather (but highly likely); if so, he was exposed to the influences of Amherst's wide-ranging Court and political connections, culminating in his failed (1816) embassy to China. Plymouth was educated at Harrow.

He married Lady Mary Sackville (1792–1864), elder daughter of John Sackville, 3rd Duke of Dorset and Arabella Diana Cope, on 5 August 1811. There was no issue of the marriage, and Lady Plymouth later married his stepfather Lord Amherst (after his wife Plymouth's mother died in 1838). Since Plymouth was richer than his brother-in-law De La Warr (1791–1869), his mother-in-law Arabella, Duchess of Dorset and Countess Whitworth, left Knole in 1825 to her elder daughter Mary, on the grounds that her husband could better afford the annual upkeep of the house. By 1829–30, the Countesses of Plymouth and De La Warr (or rather, their husbands) had partitioned the Sackville family estates between them.

== Career ==
Lord Plymouth was admitted to the House of Lords probably at the usual age of 21, although he was not active in politics. He voted against the first Reform Bill on 8 October 1831 along with the majority of the House of Lords. He was involved in the creation of the Worcester Yeomanry Division which fought in Spain. At his death, he was Colonel of the Worcestershire Yeomanry Cavalry.

Also during his tenure, the Worcester and Birmingham Canal was built through Tardebigge (Tardebeck, Worcestershire) and good taxes were collected from the nailmakers of Redditch. The canal passes very close to Hewell Grange (now a state prison) and was finished ten years after Windsor inherited his father's title. The canal was finished in 1799; however the reservoirs were built twenty years later, and finished in 1836. Windsor bought Barnt Green House from the tenant Yates family who had resided there for some years.

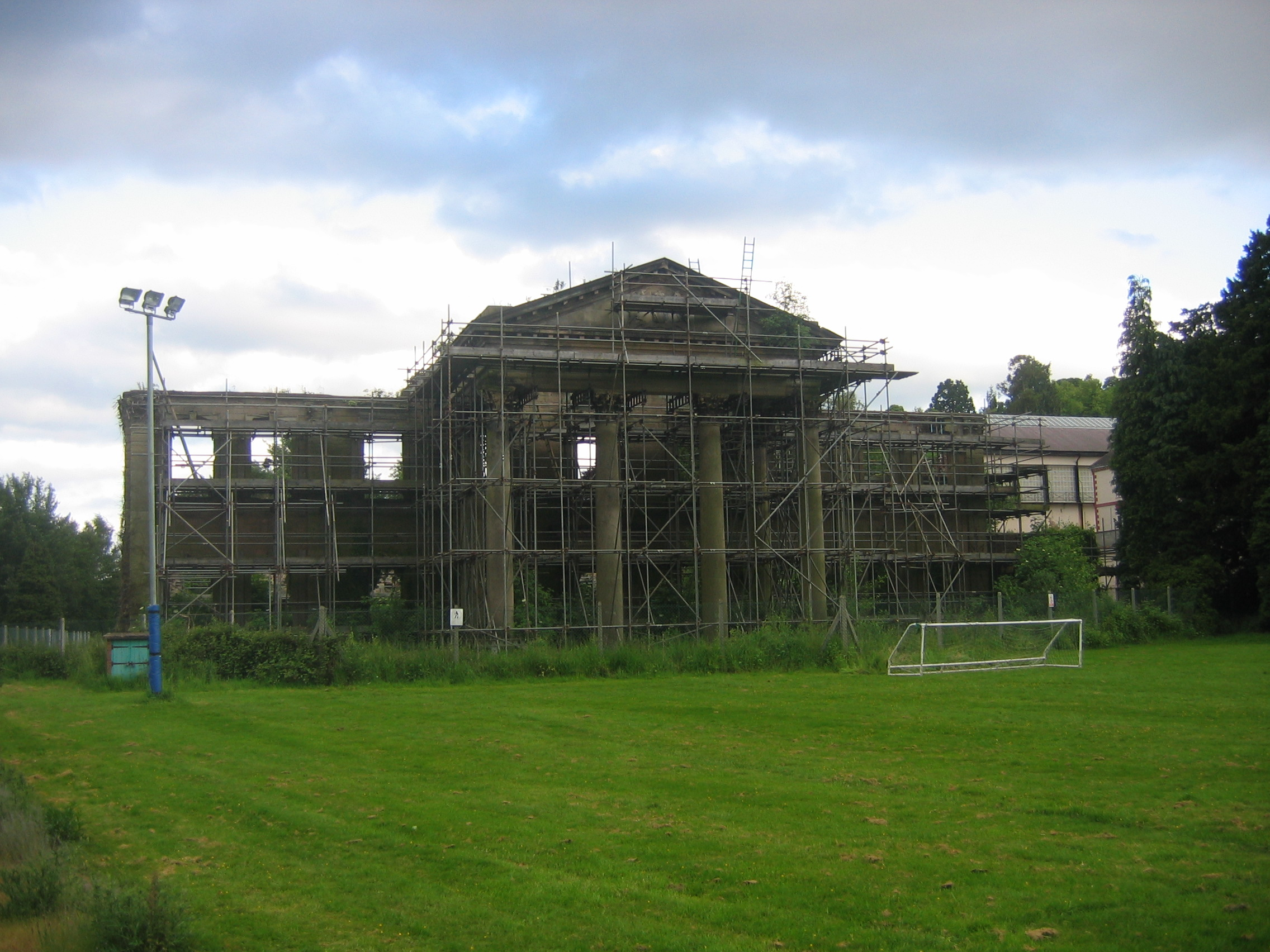
The Old Grange at Hewell Grange, where the 6th Earl kept his stud

According to his obituary, Lord Plymouth was fond of hunting and kept a large stud at Hewell Grange Worcestershire and at Melton. In October 1832, he entertained the Duchess of Kent and her young daughter, Victoria, at Hewell Grange.

== Death ==
Plymouth died on board his yacht, aged 44, at Deptford. During the night, he suffered an attack of apoplexy, and despite medical aid, died in the afternoon. He was buried in the family vault at St Bartholomew's Church in Tardebigge (then also called Tardebeck), Worcestershire. He is commemorated by an obelisk bearing his name, situated in the Lickey Hills Country Park and visible from Bromsgrove.

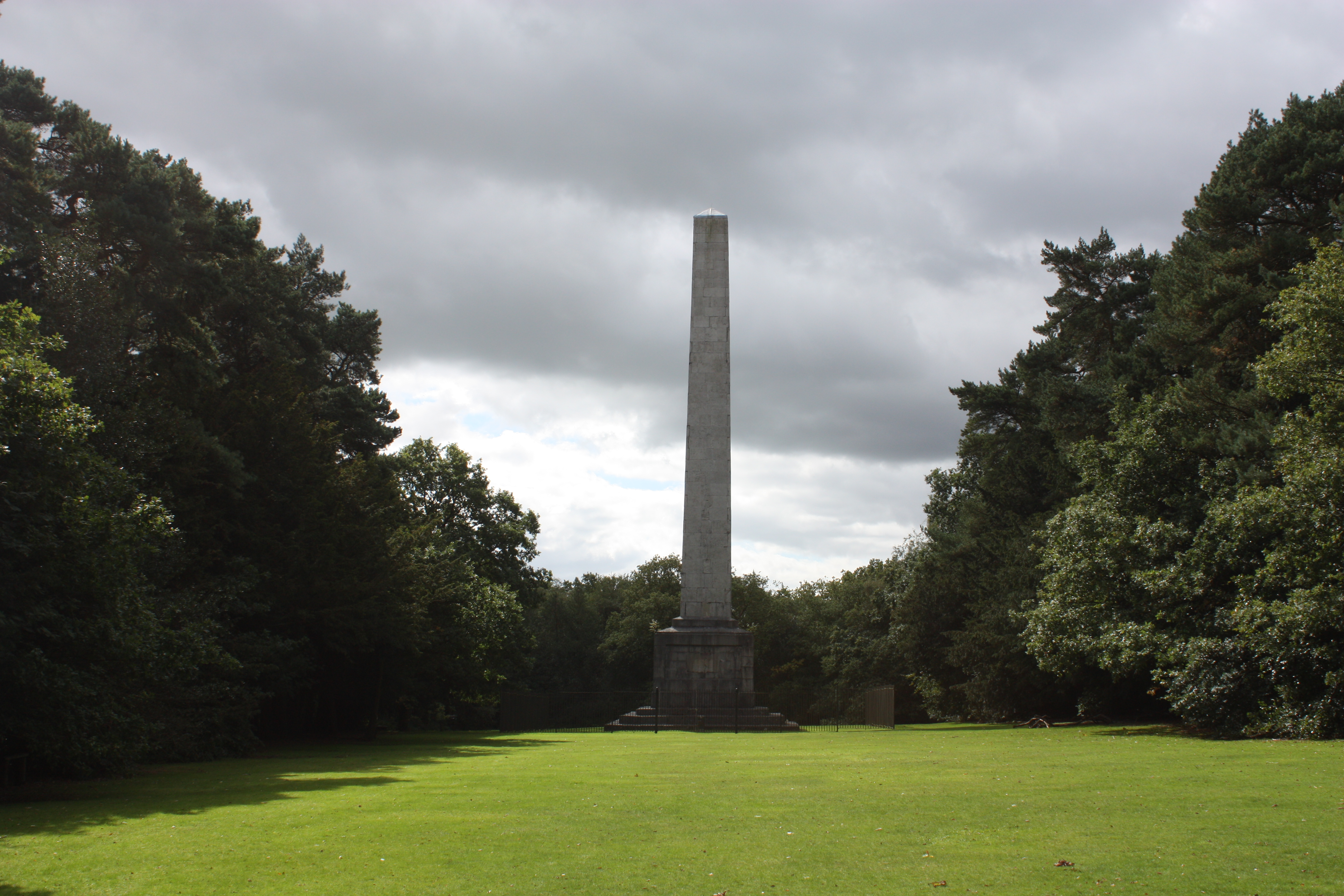
Obelisk dedicated to Other Windsor, 6th Earl of Plymouth

== Succession ==
At his death, Plymouth was succeeded in the earldom by his bachelor uncle, Rev. the Hon. Andrew Windsor (born 1764) who died unmarried in 1837. The earldom then passed to the 7th Earl's youngest brother, Henry (youngest surviving son of the 4th Earl), after whom the earldom became extinct in 1843.

The 6th Earl's death without issue meant that the Windsor barony (1529) fell into abeyance between his two sisters, until it was called out of abeyance in 1855 in favour of the younger sister Lady Harriet Clive, who became Harriet Windsor-Clive and whose sons Robert and George also took the name Windsor-Clive. Harriet's grandson Robert Windsor-Clive, 14th Baron Windsor, was created Earl of Plymouth in 1905 (third creation), and is the great-grandfather of the present Earl (born 1951). Since the present Earl is the owner of the estates held by the 6th Earl, those might have descended by the 6th Earl's will to his younger sister Harriet and her heirs male.

Peerage of England
Preceded by Other Windsor	Earl of Plymouth; 1799–1833	Succeeded by Andrew Windsor
Preceded by Other Windsor	Baron Windsor; 1799–1833	In abeyance Title next held by Harriet Windsor-Clive
