= Governor Amherst =

- Jeffery Amherst, 1st Baron Amherst (1717–1797), Crown Governor of Virginia from 1759 to 1768
- William Amherst, 1st Earl Amherst (1773–1857), Governor-General of the Presidency of Fort William from 1823 to 1828
