= Margaret Verney =

English-born Welsh educationist (1844–1930)

Margaret Maria Verney
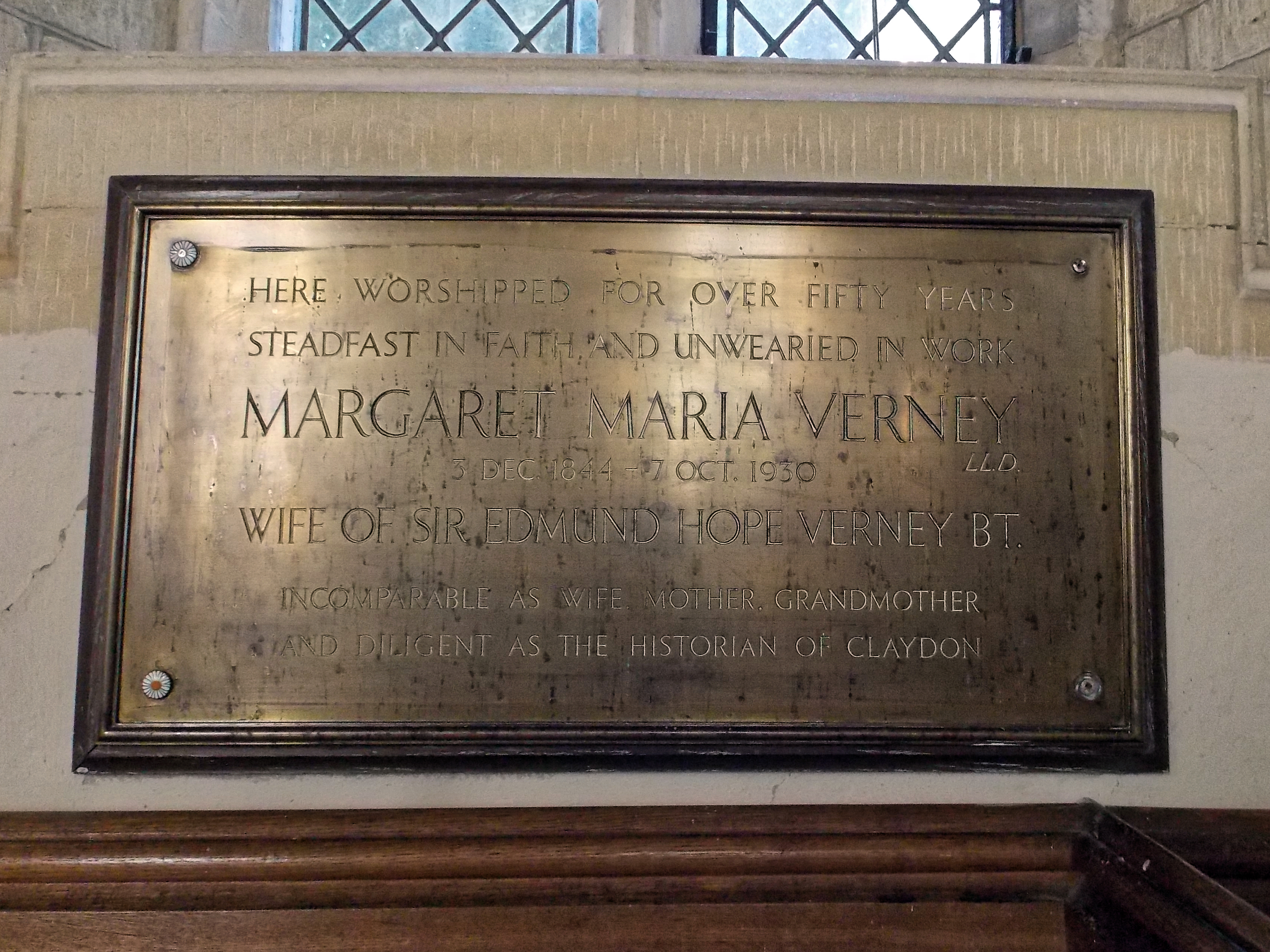
- Brass plaque to Margaret Maria Verney in All Saints' Church, Middle Claydon, Buckinghamshire
- Born: 3 December 1844
- Died: 7 October 1930 (aged 85); Rhianfa, Menai Bridge, Anglesey
- Spouse(s): Sir Edmund Hope Verney, MP (m. 1868; died 1910)
- Children: 4
- Parents: John Hay-Williams, 2nd Baronet Williams (father); Lady Sarah Elizabeth Amherst (mother)
- Relatives: Harry Verney (son)

Margaret Maria Verney (née Hay-Williams or Williams-Hay) (3 December 1844 – 7 October 1930), was an English-born Welsh educationist.

== Early life ==
Margaret Maria Hay Williams was born on 3 December 1844, the eldest daughter of Lady Sarah Elizabeth Amherst and her husband John Hay-Williams, 2nd Baronet Williams of Bodelwyddan. She had a sister, Maude. Her childhood was spent in North Wales and London and she recorded the years 1854 - 1857 in diaries. On the death of her father in 1859, she inherited his house "Rhianfa", on Anglesey, which she retained as a family home.

== Marriage ==
In 1868 she married Sir Edmund Hope Verney, MP, then known as Captain Verney, RN.

== Educational campaigning ==
Lady Verney shared her husband's Liberalism in politics, and became a leading campaigner for girls' education. She took an active part in the movement for higher education in Wales. She was junior deputy chancellor and member of the council of the North Wales University College. In 1894 she became a member of the statutory council of the University of Wales, holding the position until 1922, and received the honorary degree of LL.D. She served on rural school boards, and on the Education Committee of Buckinghamshire County Council.

In 1904 she produced an edition of the Memoirs of the Verney Family during the Seventeenth Century. She also contributed to the Dictionary of National Biography.

== See also ==
- Lady Verney High School

== Sources ==
- R. F. Verney et al. – In Memory of Margaret Maria Lady Verney (1930)
