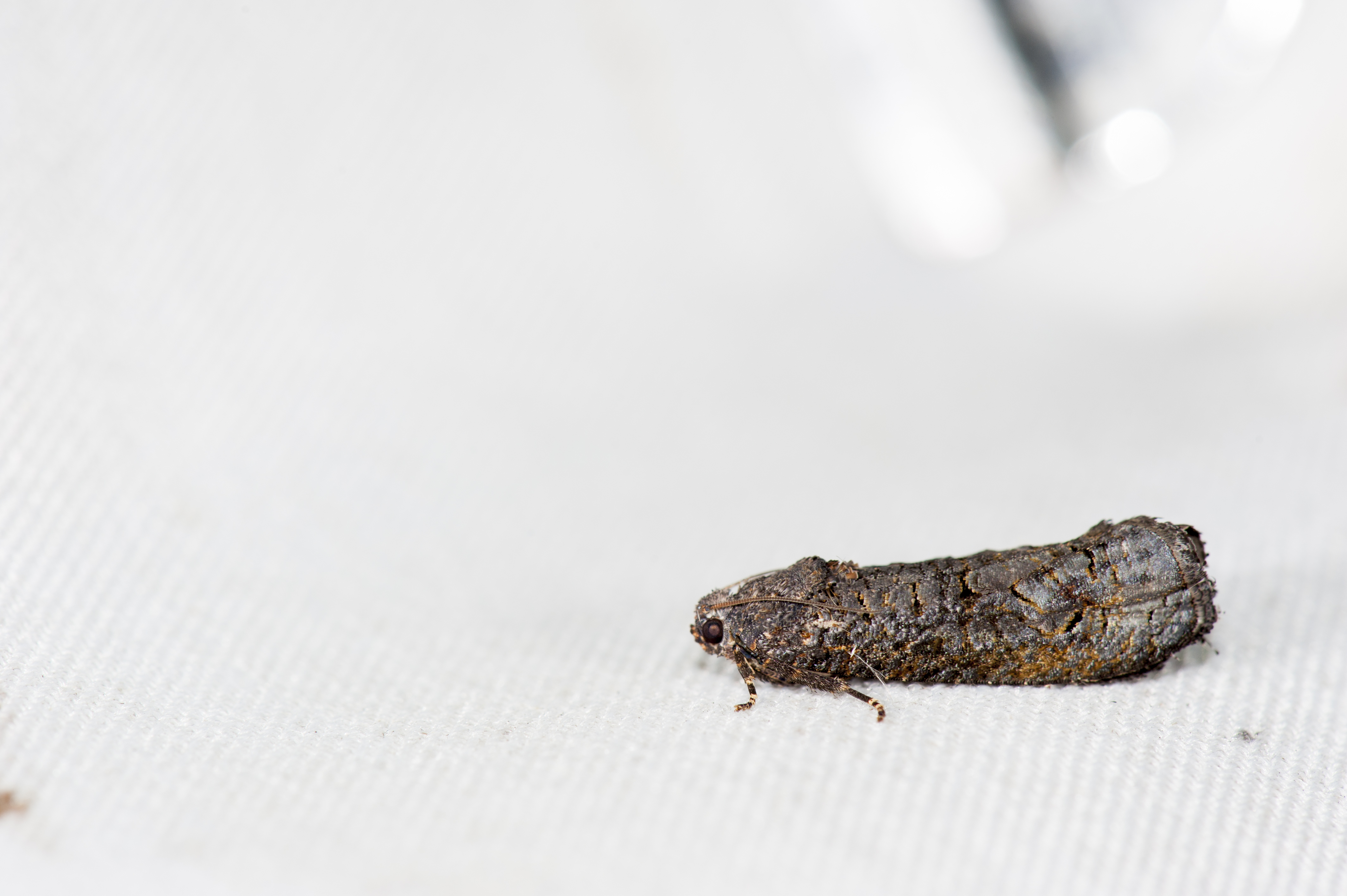

Scientific classification
- Kingdom: Animalia
- Phylum: Arthropoda
- Class: Insecta
- Order: Lepidoptera
- Family: Tortricidae
- Genus: Arcesis
- Species: A. threnodes

Binomial name
- Arcesis threnodes (Meyrick, 1905)

Synonyms
- Platypeplus threnodes Meyrick, 1905; Olethreutes threnodes Clarke, 1958; Platypeplus hemiopta Meyrick, 1905; Platypeplus tetracona Meyrick, 1907

= Arcesis threnodes =

Species of moth

Arcesis threnodes is a moth of the family Tortricidae first described by Edward Meyrick in 1905. It is found in India, Sri Lanka and Taiwan.

Larval host plants are Amherstia nobilis and Michelia champaca.

== Gallery ==
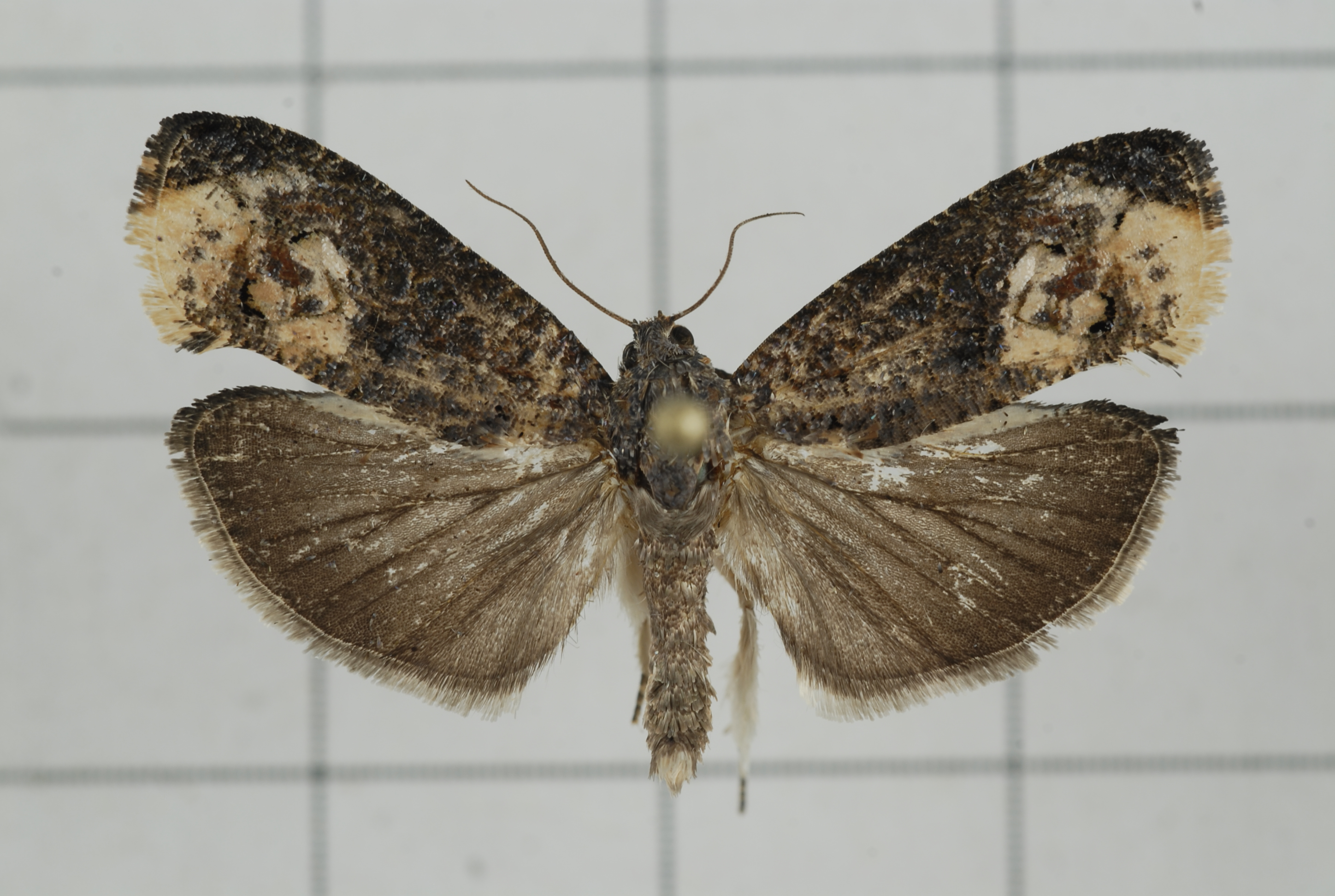

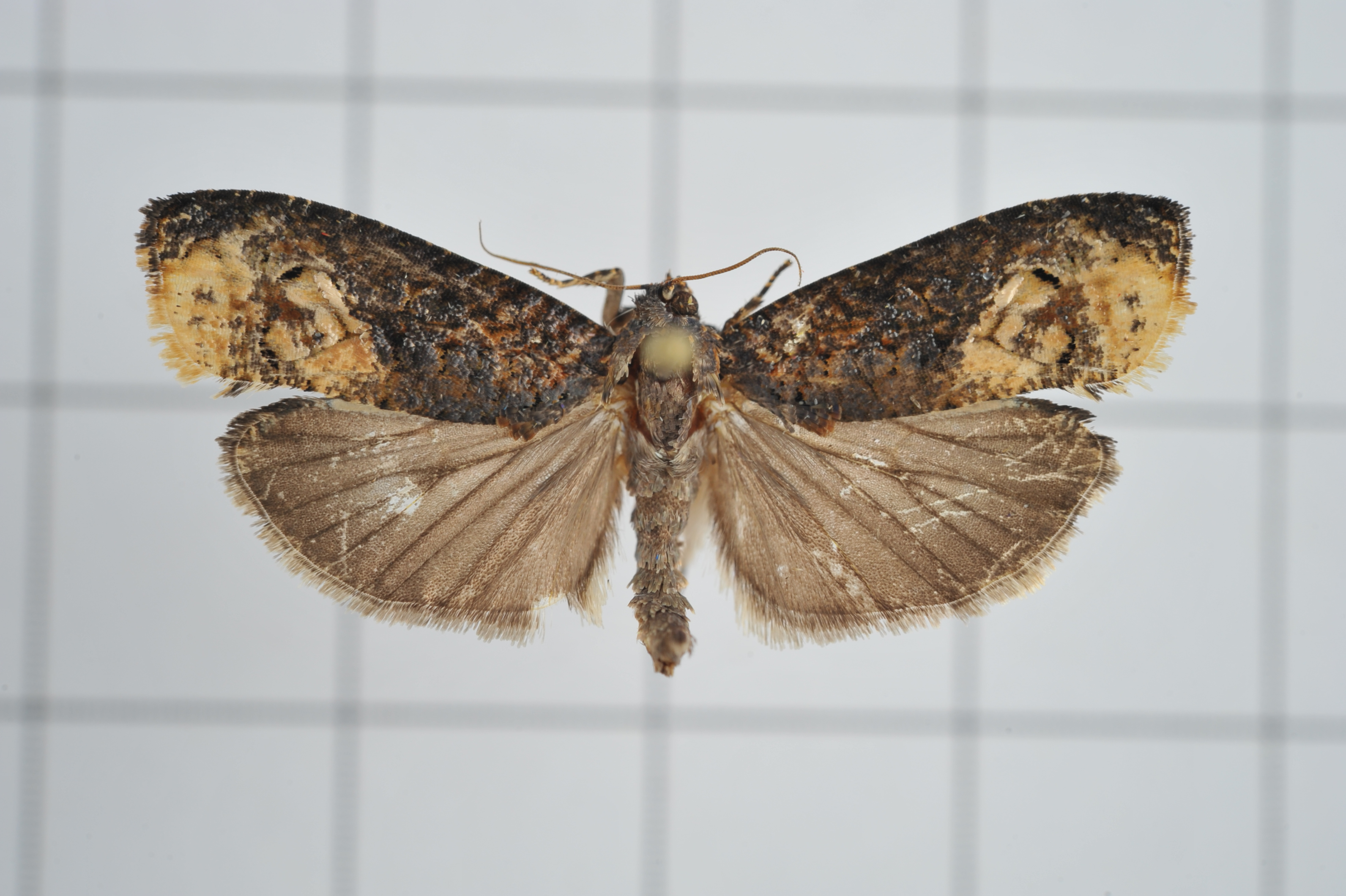

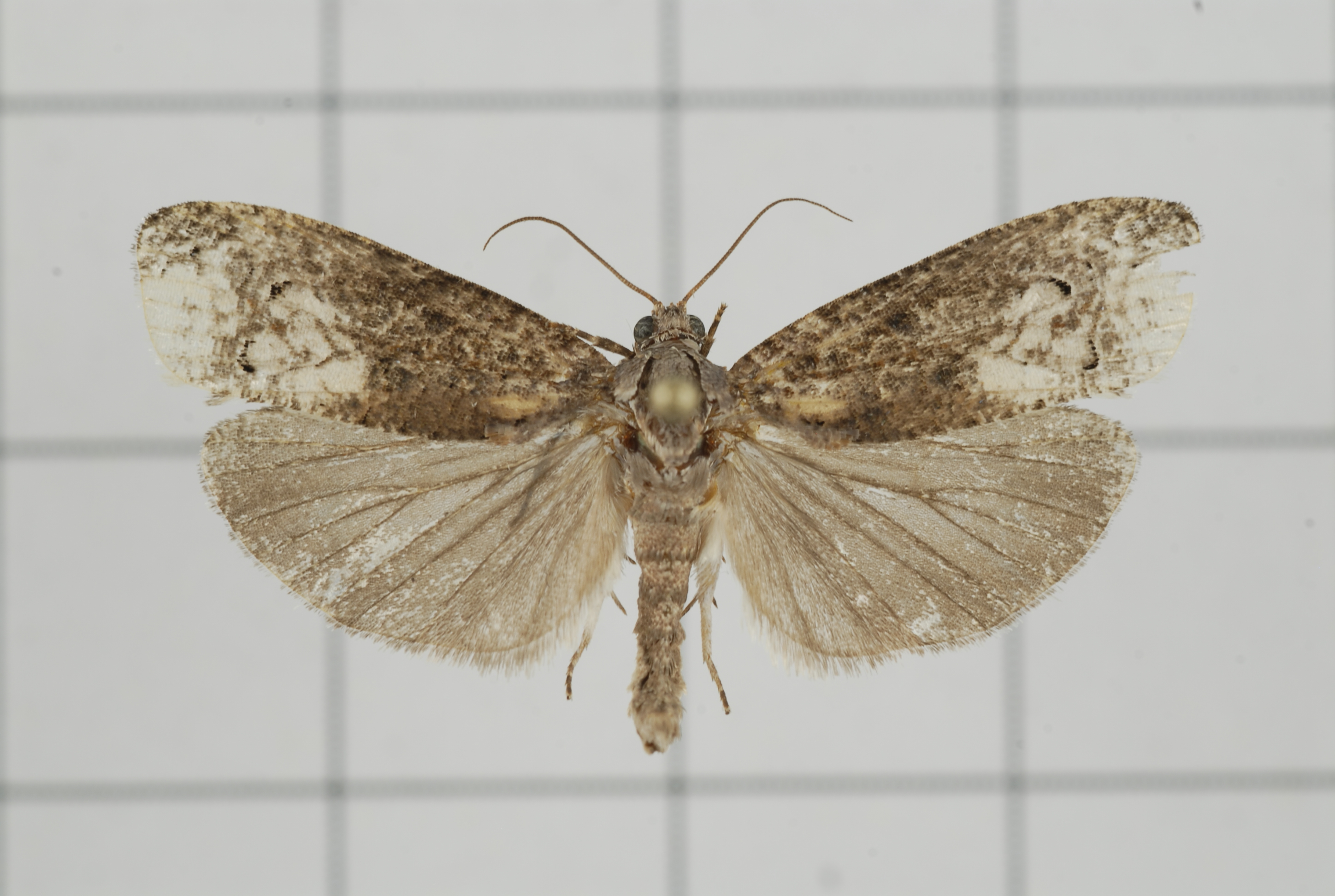

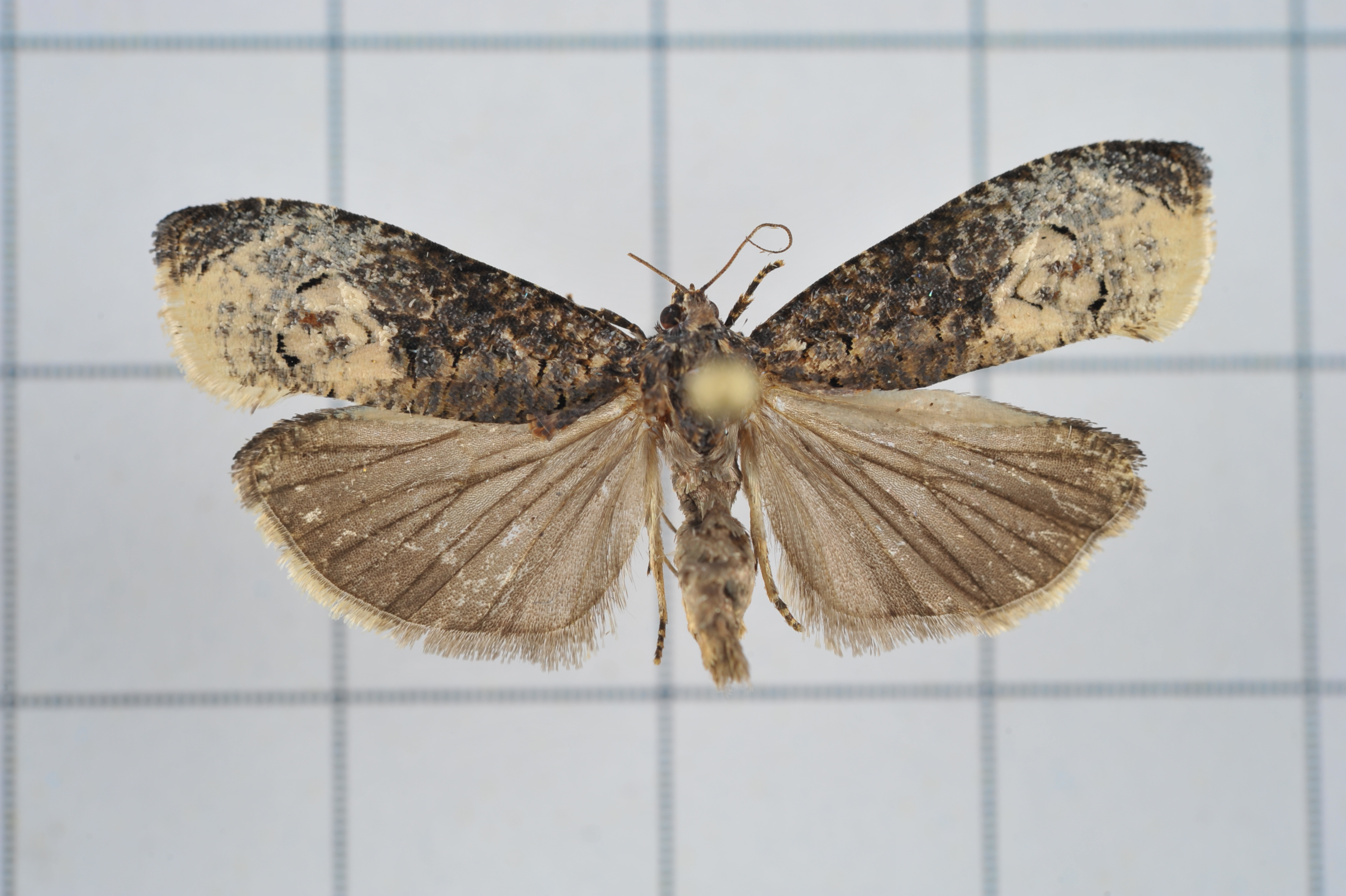
