= Governor Adam =

Governor Adam may refer to:

- Frederick Adam (1784–1853), Governor of Madras from 1832 to 1837
- John Adam (administrator) (1779–1825), Governor-General of the British East India Company in 1823
- William Patrick Adam (1823–1881), Governor of Madras from 1880 to 1881

== See also ==
- Governor Adams (disambiguation)
