= Sarah Amherst =

British botanist and artist (1762–1838)

- Countess of Plymouth; Countess Amherst
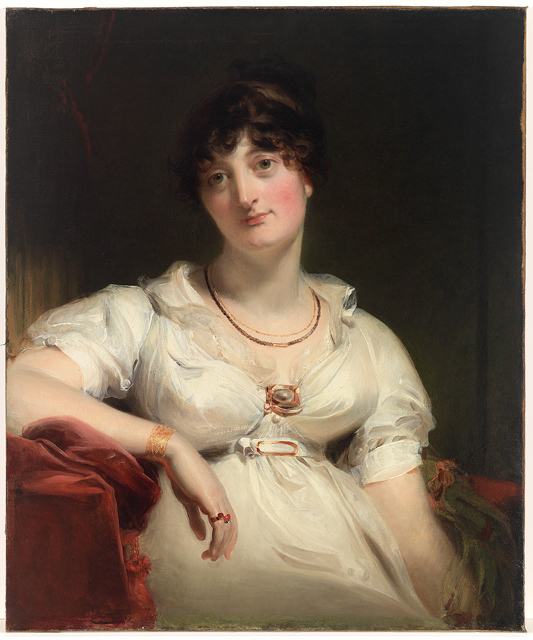
- Portrait of Sarah Windsor Amherst by British artist Thomas Lawrence
- Born: 1762
- Died: 1838 (aged 75–76)
- Spouses: Other Windsor, 5th Earl of Plymouth; William Amherst, 1st Earl Amherst
- Issue: Other Windsor, 6th Earl of Plymouth; Lady Maria Windsor; Harriet Windsor-Clive, 13th Baroness Windsor; Sarah Elizabeth Hay-Williams; Hon. Jeffrey Amherst; William Amherst, 2nd Earl Amherst; Hon. Frederick Campbell Amherst
- Father: Andrew Archer, 2nd Baron Archer
- Mother: Sarah West

Sarah Amherst, Countess Amherst (née Archer, later Sarah Windsor, Countess of Plymouth; 1762–1838), credited as Sarah Amherst, was a British naturalist and botanist who lived in India. She identified several species which were named after her, including a species of pheasant (Chrysolophus amherstiae) and a flowering tree (Amherstia nobilis).

== Marriages and issue ==
Her parents were Andrew Archer, 2nd Baron Archer, and Sarah West, daughter of James West. She was married to her first cousin Other Windsor, 5th Earl of Plymouth, from 1778 until his death in 1799. They had the following children:

- Other Archer Windsor, 6th Earl of Plymouth (1789–1833);
- Lady Maria Windsor (1790–1855), who married Arthur Hill, 3rd Marquess of Downshire;
- Harriet Windsor-Clive, 13th Baroness Windsor (1797–1869), who married the Hon. Robert Clive.

Her second husband was William Amherst, 1st Earl Amherst. Their children were:

- Lady Sarah Elizabeth Pitt Amherst (1801–1876), who married Sir John Hay-Williams, 2nd Baronet;
- Hon. Jeffrey Amherst (1802–1826);
- William Pitt Amherst, 2nd Earl Amherst (1805–1886);
- Hon. Frederick Campbell Amherst (1807–1829).
