= William Butterworth Bayley =

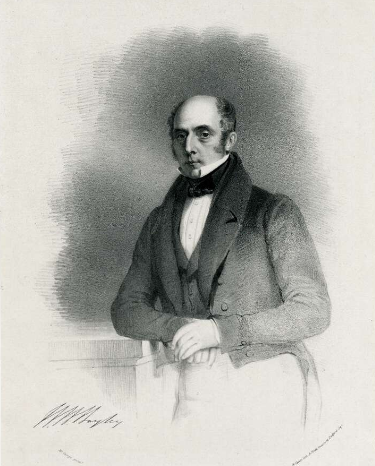
- Born: 3 November 1781
- Died: 20 May 1860 (aged 78); United Kingdom
- Occupations: Writer, Bengal Civil Service
- Spouse: Anne Augusta Bayley
- Children: Henry Vincent Bayley, Harriet Steuart Bayley, Mary Steuart Colvin, Daniel Bayley, William Butterworth Master Bayley, Henrietta Frances Campbell, Edward Henry Bayley and Steuart Colvin Bayley
- Parents: Thomas Butterworth Bayley (father); Mary Bayley Leggatt (mother)

William Butterworth Bayley (1782–1860) was acting Governor-General of India during the period March–July 1828. Bayley was a member of the Bengal Civil Service (1799–1830) and a director and chairman of the British East India Company (1834–1858).

== Life ==
Bayley, a very distinguished member of the civil service of the old East India Company, was the sixth son of Thomas Butterworth Bayley, of Hope Hall, Eccles, who served the office of high sheriff of Lancashire in 1768. He was educated at Eton, and had just gone up to Cambridge when his father obtained an appointment in the Bengal civil service for him. He reached India in 1799, just in time to be entered as a member of the new college of Fort William, which Lord Wellesley had recently established for the education of Indian civil servants. In 1800 he took a second prize in the third class for Hindustani, and in 1802 proved his talent for languages by being first in the first class in Persian. His success caused him in 1803 to be appointed an assistant in the governor-general's office, and also in that of the Persian secretary. In the governor-general's office all the cleverest young men of the civil service were collected together, and acted under Lord Wellesley's own eye. Although Bayley did not seek such active employment as Metcalfe and Jenkins, it was there that he learned the art of government. He decided not to apply for diplomatic posts, but to confine himself to the routine of judicial and revenue work.

In 1805, he was made deputy-registrar of the Sudder court, and in 1807, interpreter to the commission which, under the guidance of St. George Tucker, was to regulate the government and land settlement of Wellesley's recent conquests, now known as the North-western Provinces. He afterwards became registrar of the Sudder court, and in 1813 judge at Burdwan. In 1814 he entered the secretariat as secretary in the judicial and revenue department, and in 1819 became chief secretary to the government. In this capacity he was of the greatest service to Lord Hastings, from his thorough mastery of business and personal intimacy with all the Indian statesmen of the period — Malcolm, Elphinstone, Adam, Metcalfe, Jenkins, and Cole. In 1822 he temporarily filled a seat at the council, and in 1825 became a regular member of the supreme council in the place of James Fendall. In 1827, Metcalfe entered the council as junior member, and in 1828 Bayley filled the office of governor-general from March to July after the departure of Lord Amherst, and until the arrival of Lord William Bentinck.

In November 1830, his term of office expired, and he returned to England. In 1833, he was elected a director of the East India Company, in 1839 deputy-chairman, and in 1840 chairman of the court, and filled the office so satisfactorily that he was universally recommended in 1854, on the reconstitution of the court of directors, to be a permanent member. But change was distasteful to him, and he refused to act in that capacity; he also refused a seat in the new council of India, established on the abolition of the East India Company in 1859. He was the father of Steuart Bayley.

== Legacy ==
He died at St Leonards-on-Sea, Sussex in May 1860, having survived not only all his friends, but the very system in which he had lived and gained reputation. His name must always be coupled with those of his more stirring contemporaries, and his work, though not so conspicuous, was as well done as that of Metcalfe or Jenkins.

He was essentially an official, and a typical official of the school that Wellesley had trained to be not only able in emergencies, but steady and industrious in official work. That he received no distinction for his services was due to his own unassuming modesty, but he bequeathed the traditions of his ability in India to two able Indian administrators, his nephew, Sir Edward Clive Bayley, formerly a member of the supreme council, and his son, Sir Steuart Bayley, at one time chief commissioner of Assam. His grandson, Charles Stuart Bayley, son of Daniel Bayley, was born in March 1854. He was the Lieutenant governor of East Bengal and Assam from 1911 to 1912.

Government offices
Preceded by The Earl Amherst	Governor-General of India, acting 1828	Succeeded by Lord William Bentinck
