= Sarah Elizabeth Hay-Williams =

British artist (1801-1876)

- Born: Lady Sarah Elizabeth Amherst; 9 July 1801
- Died: 8 August 1876 (aged 75); Chateau Rhianfa, Anglesey, Wales
- Known for: watercolour painting
- Spouse: Sir John Hay-Williams (m. 1842; died 1859)
- Children: 2, including Margaret
- Parents: William Amherst, 1st Earl Amherst (father); Sarah Archer (mother)
- Relatives: William Amherst (brother); Sir Harry Verney, 4th Baronet (grandson)

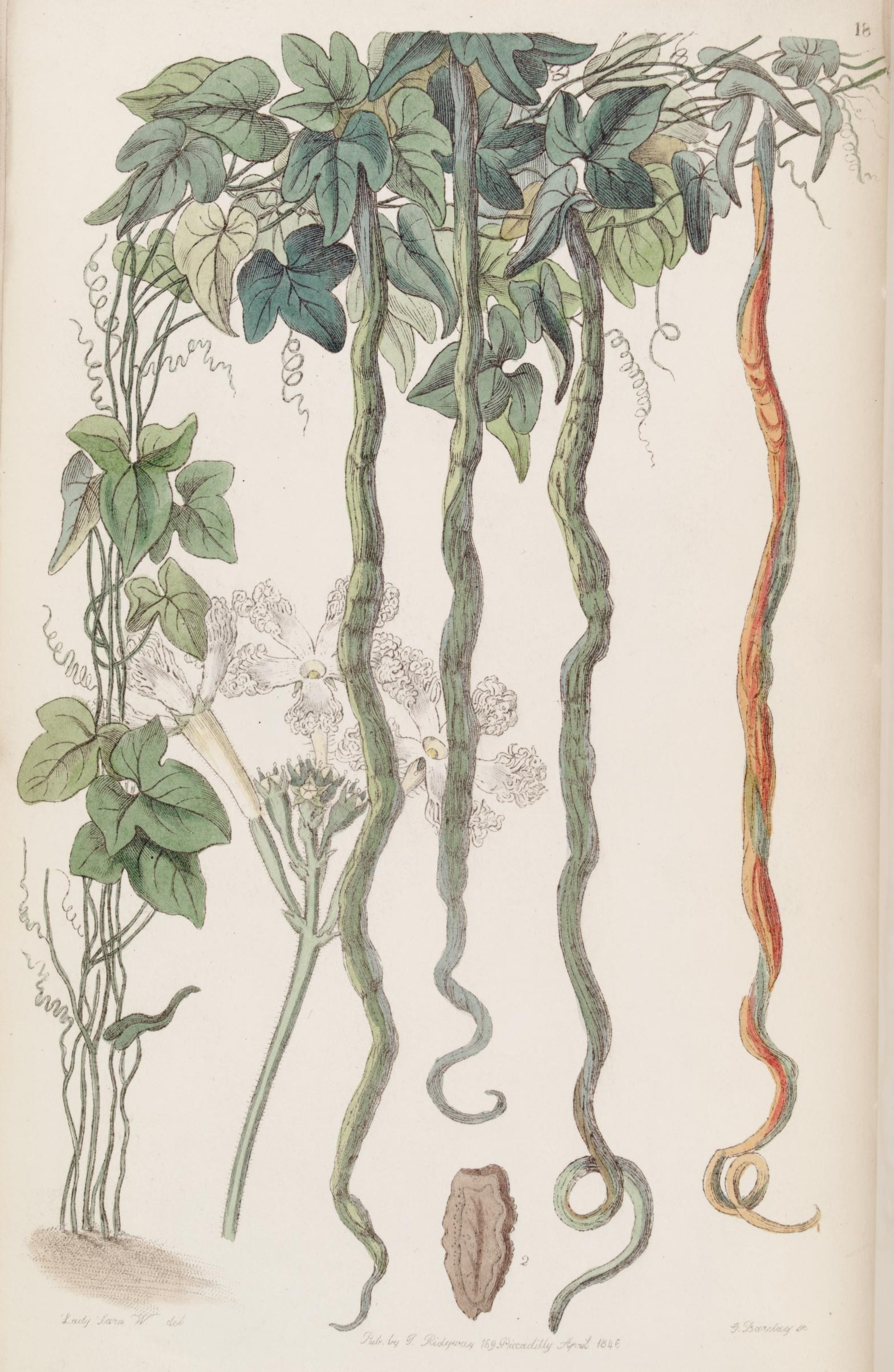
Illustration by Sarah Elizabeth Hay-Williams

Lady Sarah Elizabeth Hay-Williams (née Amherst; 9 July 1801 – 8 August 1876) was an English artist and botanical illustrator. She was born on 9 July 1801 to Sarah Amherst and William Amherst, 1st Earl Amherst. She travelled with her parents to India and while there completed several watercolour paintings now held in the collection of the British Library. She later married Sir John Hay-Williams in 1842. In 1846 Hay-Williams contributed a watercolour to Edwards's Botanical Register. After returning to the United Kingdom she had two children including Margaret Verney. She died in 1876 at Chateau Rhianfa in Anglesey on 8 August 1876.

The leguminous tree Amherstia nobilis is named by Danish botanist Nathaniel Wallich in honour of her and her mother Sarah Amherst.
