= Arcesis anax =

Scientific classification
- Kingdom: Animalia
- Phylum: Arthropoda
- Class: Insecta
- Order: Lepidoptera
- Family: Tortricidae
- Genus: Arcesis
- Species: A. anax

Binomial name
- Arcesis anax Diakonoff, 1983

Species of moth

Arcesis anax is a moth of the family Tortricidae. It is found in Vietnam, Thailand and Sumatra.
