= Governor Adams =

Governor Adams may refer to:

- Alva Adams (governor) (1850–1922), Governor of Colorado
- Billy Adams (politician) (1861–1954), Governor of Colorado, brother of Alva Adams.
- James Hopkins Adams (1812–1861), Governor of South Carolina
- Jewett W. Adams (1835–1920), Governor of Nevada
- Samuel Adams (1722–1803), Governor of Massachusetts
- Samuel Adams (Arkansas politician) (1805–1850), Acting Governor of Arkansas
- Sherman Adams (1899–1986), Governor of New Hampshire

== See also ==
- Governor Adam (disambiguation)
