= Other Windsor, 5th Earl of Plymouth =

English peer (1751–1799)

The Right Honourable Other Windsor FRS
- Earl of Plymouth
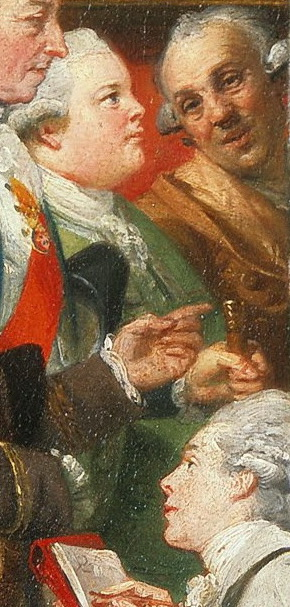
- A portrait of Plymouth in The Tribuna of the Uffizi (detail) by Johan Zoffany
- Tenure: 1771–1799
- Predecessor: Other Windsor, 4th Earl of Plymouth
- Successor: Other Windsor, 6th Earl of Plymouth
- Born: 30 May 1751
- Died: 12 June 1799 (aged 48)
- Spouse: Hon. Sarah Archer (m. 1778)
- Issue: Other Windsor, 6th Earl of Plymouth; Lady Maria Windsor; Harriet Windsor-Clive, 13th Baroness Windsor

Other Hickman Windsor, 5th Earl of Plymouth FRS (30 May 1751 – 12 June 1799), styled Lord Windsor until 1771, was an English peer.

== Early life ==
Styled Lord Windsor from birth, he was the eldest son of Other Windsor, 4th Earl of Plymouth, and the Honourable Catherine, daughter of Thomas Archer, 1st Baron Archer. He was elected a Fellow of the Royal Society on 22 April 1773. He was Colonel of the Glamorganshire Militia, 6 August 1779. Other Windsor, 5th Earl of Plymouth was featured in Johan Zoffany's painting Tribuna of the Uffizi painted between 1772 and 1778. The 5th Earl is one of a number of visiting English noblemen to the Tribuna room in the Uffizi in Florence, Italy. The painting is part of the United Kingdom's Royal Collection.

== Marriage ==
Lord Plymouth married his first cousin the Honourable Sarah, daughter of Andrew Archer, 2nd Baron Archer, on 20 May 1778. She was a notable botanist. They had several children, including:

- Other Archer Windsor, 6th Earl of Plymouth (2 July 1789 – 20 July 1833)
- Lady Maria Windsor (1790 – 7 April 1855), wife of Arthur Hill, 3rd Marquess of Downshire.
- Harriet Windsor-Clive, Baroness Windsor (30 July 1797 – 9 November 1869), wife of Robert Clive.

== Death ==
Lord Plymouth died in June 1799, aged 48, and was succeeded in the earldom by his son, Other. The Dowager Countess of Plymouth married as her second husband William Amherst, 2nd Baron Amherst, later Earl Amherst.

Peerage of England
Preceded by Other Windsor	Earl of Plymouth; 1771–1799	Succeeded by Other Archer Windsor
