= Harriet Windsor-Clive, 13th Baroness Windsor =

British landowner (1797–1869)

Harriet Windsor-Clive
- The Baroness Windsor
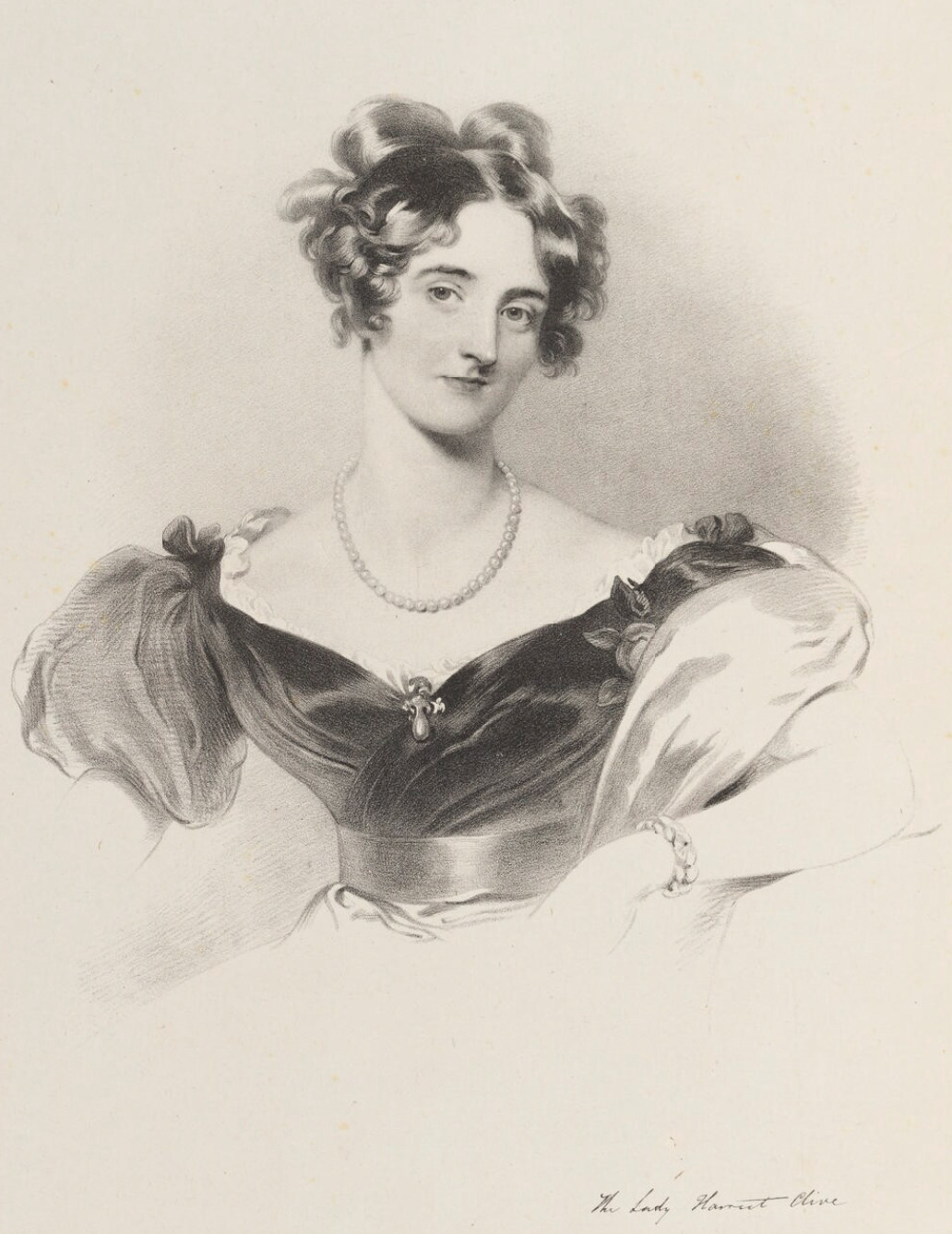
- Lady Harriet Clive, by Richard James Lane c. 1823–5
- Predecessor: Other Windsor, 6th Earl of Plymouth
- Successor: Robert Windsor-Clive, The Lord Windsor
- Born: 30 July 1797; Mayfair, London
- Baptised: 1 September 1797; St George's Church, Hanover Square
- Died: 9 November 1869 (aged 72); St Leonards-on-Sea, Sussex
- Buried: 16 November 1869; Bromfield, Shropshire
- Spouse: Hon. Robert Clive MP
- Father: Other Windsor, 5th Earl of Plymouth
- Mother: Hon. Sarah Windsor (née Archer)

Harriet Windsor-Clive, 13th Baroness Windsor (née Lady Harriet Windsor; 30 July 1797 – 9 November 1869), was a British landowner and wealthy benefactor in the Penarth and Cardiff area of South Wales. She is probably best known for developing Penarth Dock in competition with the Marquess of Bute's docks in Cardiff and for her charitable donations in the area.

After the death of her brother, the 6th Earl of Plymouth, in 1833, the subsidiary title of the earldom, Baron Windsor, fell in abeyance. After the death of her elder sister in 1855, the abeyance was terminated in her favour in October 1855 and she became The Baroness Windsor. She legally changed her name to Harriet Windsor-Clive in November 1855.

== Background ==
Lady Harriet Windsor was born on 30 July 1797 in Mayfair, the third child and second daughter of Other Windsor, 5th Earl of Plymouth. In 1819, she married Robert Henry Clive (1789–1854), a Member of Parliament for Ludlow, Shropshire.

After the sudden death of their brother in 1833, Harriet and her sister Maria (who was the wife of the 3rd Marquess of Downshire) became co-heiresses of their father's estate, known as the Plymouth Estate. It covered the land in Glamorgan on which the town of Penarth and the Cardiff suburb of Grangetown are now built. It also included St Fagans Castle, the family's seat in the area. With Harriet being the favourite sister, the bulk of the Plymouth Estate was left to her, including Hewell Grange in Worcestershire and St Fagans Castle. Previously living in Essex, Harriet moved to Cardiff while the St Fagans property was restored. When the restoration was complete, they lived at Hewell Grange but visited St Fagans frequently.

== Business interests ==
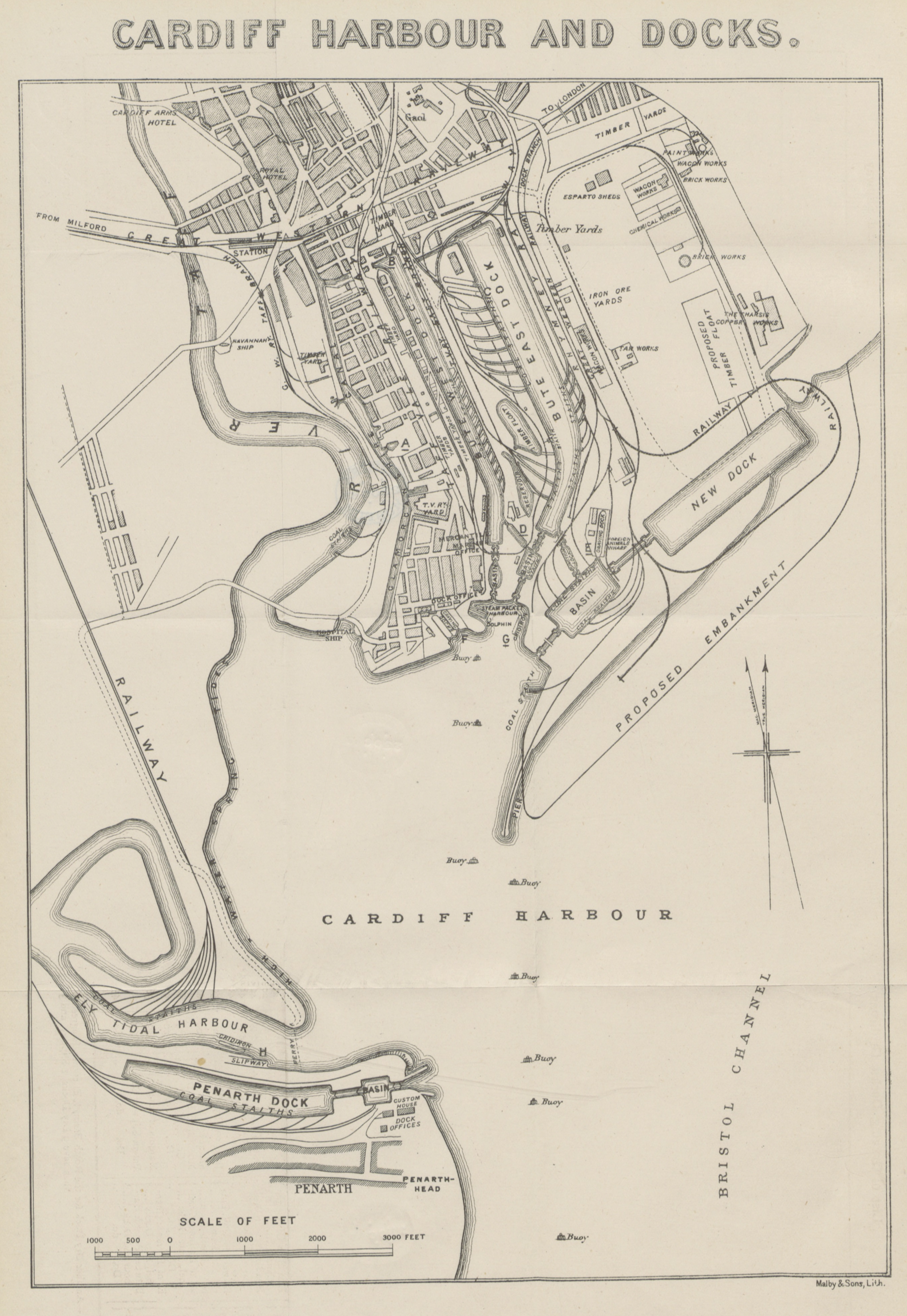
1882 map of Cardiff Harbour, with Penarth Dock to the south and the early streets of Grangetown shown on the left of the map

=== Penarth Dock ===
In 1855, Baroness Windsor formed the Penarth Harbour Company to develop a dock for Penarth on her land. She intended to compete with the new Cardiff Docks, which were being developed by the 2nd and 3rd Marquess of Bute. The docks, curving between Penarth Head and the River Ely, were completed by 1865. Baroness Windsor was due to perform the opening ceremony on 10 June 1865, but failed to turn up in time to meet the high tide. The chairman of the Taff Vale Railway (who were lessees of the dock) made the baroness's excuses and performed the ceremony. Baroness Windsor petitioned (unsuccessfully) against the Bute Dock bills, but the Penarth Docks were a success all the same exporting 900,000 tons of coal a year by 1870.

=== Grangetown ===
In 1857, the Baroness obtained an Act to enable her to develop her lands on the Cardiff side of the River Ely. The new housing development was to be called The Grange, and is now known as Grangetown. One of the earliest pubs, operating from the 1860s until 2008 on Penarth Road, was called The Baroness Windsor.

== Philanthropy ==
On her death, Baroness Windsor was praised her as "simple and unostentatious in her manner" and generous towards charitable causes, The Cardiff and Merthyr Guardian saying "In every movement which tended to the well-being of those around her, her large subscriptions expressed her sympathy with them".

She paid for the construction of the Church of St Fagan, Trecynon, near Aberdare (1852–1853), then, when it burnt down in 1856, paid for its construction a second time. She contributed towards the restoration of a number of churches in the Cardiff area, including St Mary's Church at St Fagans, Radyr's St John the Baptist and the Cathedral at Llandaff. The national schools at Aberdare and Penarth were also financed from her purse. Shortly before her death she financed the building of St Philip's Church in Webheath, Redditch, including the three-lighted stained glass above the altar, however she died before its consecration in February 1870.

== Marriage and issue ==
With her husband Robert Clive (1789–1854), she had eight children:

- Hon. Henrietta Sarah Windsor-Clive Hussey (28 March 1820 – 30 January 1899), artist; married in 1853 Edward Hussey of Scotney Castle, Sussex; mother of William Clive Hussey
- Charlotte Mary Florentia Clive (14 August 1822 – 27 May 1846), died in Florence, aged 18
- Hon. Robert Windsor-Clive (24 May 1824 – 4 August 1859), married in 1852 Lady Mary Selina Louisa Bridgeman, fifth daughter of the Earl of Bradford; their son Robert inherited the Windsor barony and was created Earl of Plymouth in 1905
- Hon. Mary Windsor-Clive (7 September 1828 – 16 June 1873), died unmarried
- Herbert Edward Clive (14 January 1830 – 6 May 1833), died in childhood of lung inflammation
- Lt.-Col. Hon. George Windsor-Clive (1835–1918), a Royal Navy officer and politician
- Hon. William Windsor Windsor-Clive (11 August 1837 – 24 September 1857), killed in railway accident
- Hon. Victoria Alexandrina Windsor-Clive (12 December 1839 – 18 July 1920), goddaughter and namesake of Queen Victoria; married in 1874 Rev. Edward ffarington Clayton

== Death ==
Lady Windsor died in St Leonards-on-Sea, Sussex, on 9 November 1869, having been ill for a few months. With her eldest son having died earlier, her estate was passed to her infant grandson, Robert Windsor-Clive, who became The Baron Windsor and later the 1st Earl of Plymouth when the title was revived in 1905.

She was buried on 16 November at the church of Bromfield, Shropshire, in a vault with her late husband and son. Shops were closed for part of the day in Bromsgrove, Ludlow and Redditch.

Peerage of England
In abeyance Title last held by Other Windsor	Baroness Windsor; 1855–1869	Succeeded by Robert Windsor-Clive
