= Chateau Rhianfa =

Listed building in Anglesey, North Wales

- House of Rhianfa; Plas Rhianfa
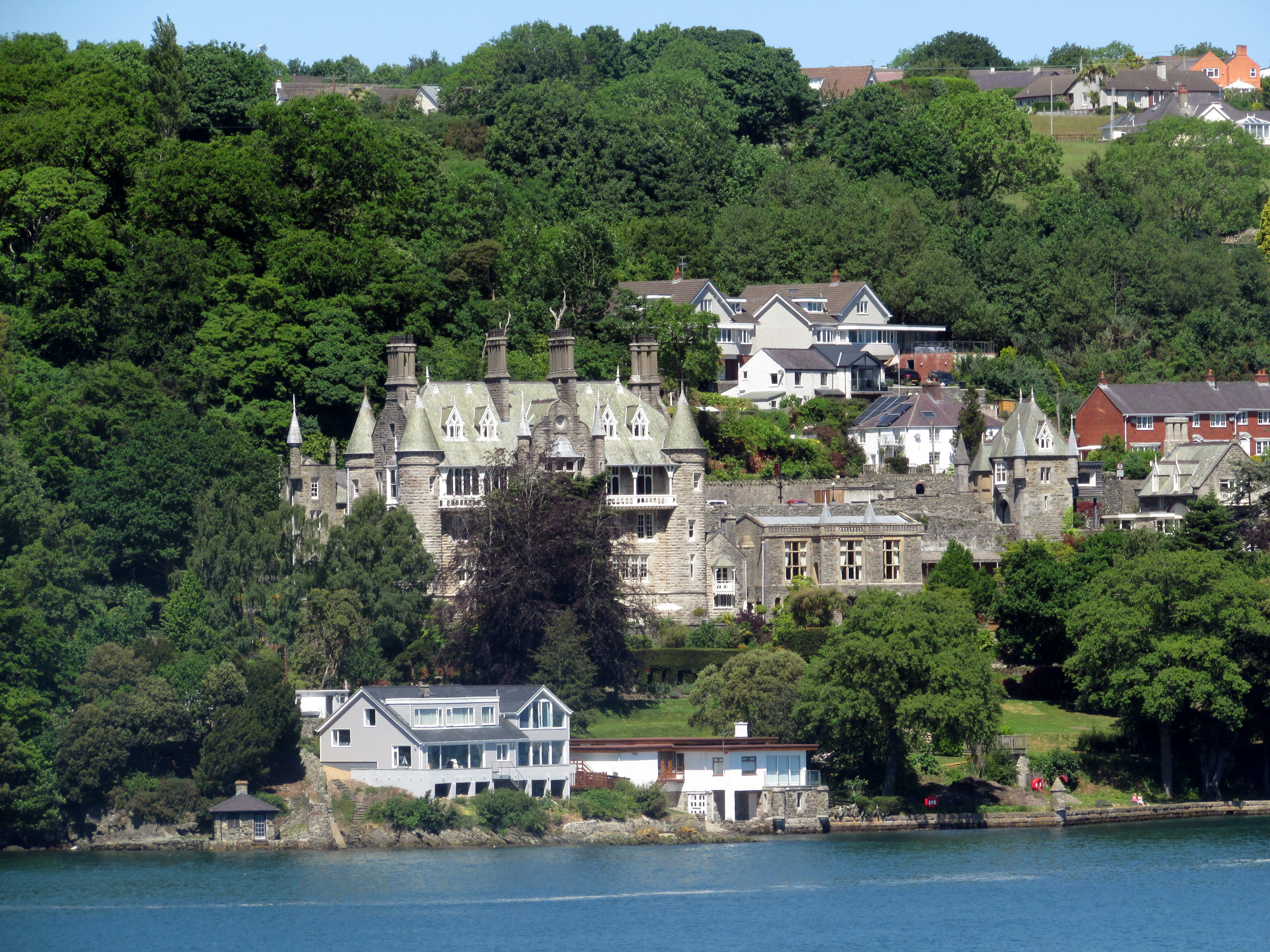

- Location in Wales
- 53.2382°N 4.1438°W
- Location: Beaumaris Road, Anglesey, Wales

History
- Built: 1849
- Built for: John Hay-Williams

Site notes
- Architect: Charles Reed
- Architectural style: French Gothic

Listed Building – Grade II*
- Designated: 6 September 2004
- Reference no.: 81142

Chateau Rhianfa is a Grade II*-listed hotel and former mansion in Anglesey, North Wales. Its gardens are also listed as Grade II* on the Cadw/ICOMOS Register of Parks and Gardens of Special Historic Interest in Wales.

== History ==
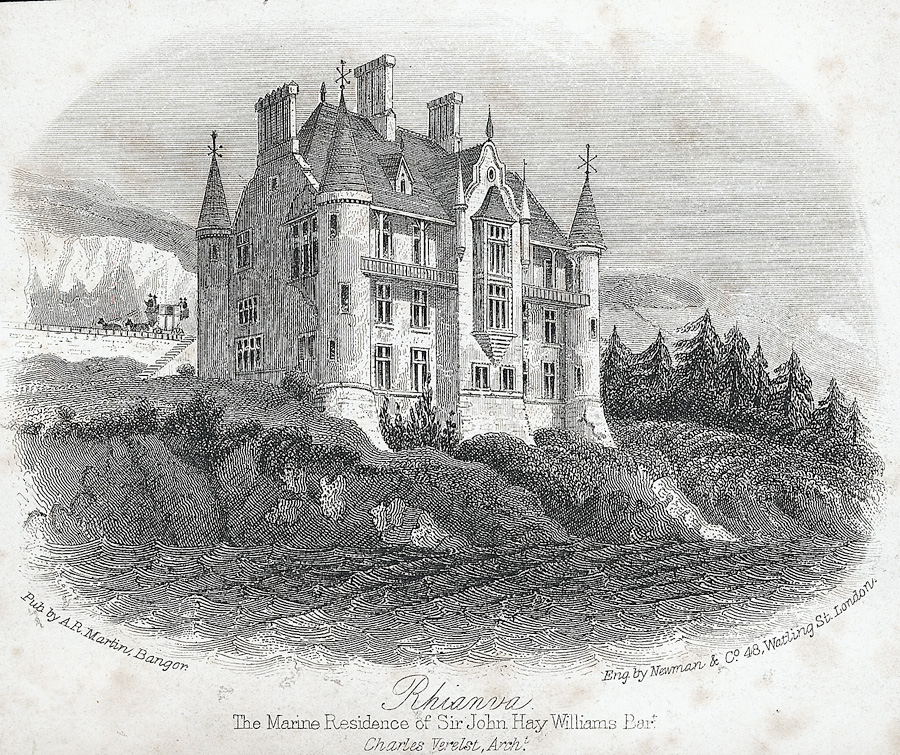
Rhianfa from an engraving

Chateau Rhianfa, also known as Plas Rhianfa and the House of Rhianfa, is located on the Menai Strait, between Menai Bridge and Beaumaris. The estate was given to Sir John Williams, 1st Baronet of Bodelwyddan in 1828 by his parents.

The house was built for Sir John Hay-Williams, 2nd Baronet of Bodelwyddan, and his wife Lady Sarah Elizabeth Hay-Williams. The architect was Charles Reed (1814–1859, also known as Charles Verelst), although Sir John and Lady Sarah did much of the design work. The builder was John Rogers of Beaumaris, and construction began in the spring of 1849.

Originally the house was intended to provide a residence for William's wife and daughters in the event of his death. The house was completed two years later in 1851. The house remained in the possession of the Williams family until 1957 when it was sold and converted into a number of apartments. Most of the land surrounding the house was also sold, leaving three acres attached to the estate.

In 2012 the building reopened as a hotel, with three cottages within the estate converted into guest houses. Chateau Rhianfa has been awarded a 5 star guest accommodation grading from Visit Wales and a Visit Wales Gold Award. Chateau Rhianfa was also winner of the 2012 Quality Regeneration Tourism Award from the Anglesey Tourism Awards.

== Architectural style ==
The Williams family had travelled extensively in the Loire region of France and drew inspiration for their home from the chateaux they observed there. Lady Sarah Williams was said to be particularly fond of the architectural style popularised by King Francois I. Chateau Rhianfa's architecture draws on the châteaux of Blois, Chambord, Amboise, Chenonceau and Chaumont. The house is a Grade II* listed building, and its gardens are listed at Grade II on the Cadw/ICOMOS Register of Parks and Gardens of Special Historic Interest in Wales.
