= Arcesis =

Scientific classification
- Kingdom: Animalia
- Phylum: Arthropoda
- Class: Insecta
- Order: Lepidoptera
- Family: Tortricidae
- Subfamily: Olethreutinae
- Tribe: Olethreutini
- Genus: Arcesis; Diakonoff, 1983

Genus of tortrix moths

Arcesis is a genus of moths belonging to family Tortricidae.

== Species ==
- Arcesis anax Diakonoff, 1983
- Arcesis tetracona (Meyrick, 1907)
- Arcesis threnodes (Meyrick, 1905)

== See also ==
- List of Tortricidae genera
