= Thomas Butterworth Bayley =

British agriculturist and lawyer

Thomas Butterworth Bayley JP FRS
- Born: 1744
- Died: 1802 (aged 57–58); Buxton, Derbyshire
- Education: University of Edinburgh
- Occupations: Magistrate; Agriculturist; Philanthropist

Thomas Butterworth Bayley JP FRS (1744–1802) was an English magistrate, agriculturist and philanthropist.

== Background ==
He was from an old Lancashire family, and his mother was one of the Dukinfields of Dukinfield, Cheshire. Shortly after completing his education at the University of Edinburgh, he was chosen a justice of the peace for the county palatine of Lancaster. The reputation he acquired by led to his being appointed a few years afterwards perpetual chairman of the quarter sessions. He was appointed High Sheriff of Lancashire for 1768.

== Magistracy ==
Principally by his efforts, an improved gaol and penitentiary-house for Manchester was erected in 1787. In his honour, it was named the New Bayley. The building was pulled down in 1873. After improvements introduced in its construction, and in that of the county gaol at Lancaster, Bayley was consulted in regard to the erection and improvement of prisons throughout the country.

== Health Conditions ==
Bayley also took an active interest in sanitary reform, and in schemes for improving the condition of the poor. In 1796 he was successful in obtaining in Manchester the establishment of a board of health, of which he was chosen chairman. He was one of the founders of the Literary and Philosophical Society of Manchester, and of a college of arts and sciences, which was later abandoned. Much of his spare time he devoted to agriculture, and on his farm of Hope near Manchester introduced various new agricultural methods, including an improved system of sod draining. He wrote a pamphlet entitled On a Cheap and Expeditious Method of Draining Land, which was published in Alexander Hunter's Georgical Essays, vol. iv. (1772), and vol. i. (1803). He was also the author of Observations on the General Highway and Turnpike Acts, 1773.

Bayley was elected Fellow of the Royal Society in 1773. He died at Buxton, Derbyshire, on 24 June 1802.

== Notes ==
Attribution

This article incorporates text from a publication now in the public domain: Stephen, Leslie, ed. (1885). "Bayley, Thomas Butterworth". Dictionary of National Biography. Vol. 3. London: Smith, Elder & Co.
