= John Adam (administrator) =

British administrator in India

John Adam (4 May 1779 – 4 June 1825) was a British administrator in India, serving as the acting Governor-General of the British East India Company in 1823.

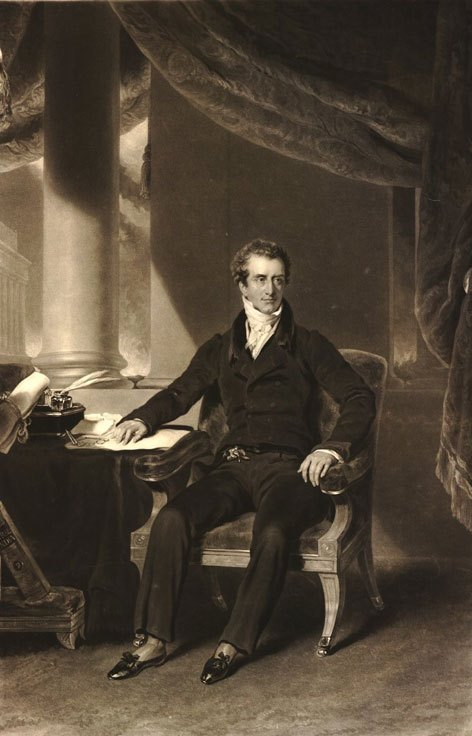
An engraving of John Adam by Charles Turner

== Life ==
The eldest son of William Adam of Blair Adam, he was born on 4 May 1779, and was educated at Charterhouse School. He received a writership on the Bengal establishment in 1794; and, after a year at Edinburgh University, landed at Calcutta in India in February 1796 to work for the East India Company.

Most of Adam's career was spent in the secretariat. He was private as well as political secretary to the Marquess of Hastings, whom he accompanied in the field during the Third Anglo-Maratha War. In 1817 he was nominated by the court of directors a member of council. In 1819 he became a member of the Supreme Council of India.

As senior member of council, Adam became Acting Governor General of India on Lord Hastings's departure in January 1823. His rule lasted for seven months, until the arrival of Lord Amherst in August of the same year. It saw the suppression of the freedom of the English press in India. James Silk Buckingham had established the Calcutta Journal, which published severe comments on the government. Adam cancelled Buckingham's license for residence in India, and passed regulations restricting newspaper criticism. Buckingham appealed to the court of proprietors at home, to the House of Commons, and to the Privy Council; but the action of Adam was upheld by each of these three bodies. Another unpopular act of Adam's governor-generalship was to withdraw official support from the banking firm of Palmer, who had acquired great influence with the Nizam of Hyderabad.

Adam also appropriated public money for the encouragement of Indian education. His health broke down and he left his job and he left in March 1825. After a voyage to Bombay, and a visit to Almorah in the lower Himalayas, he embarked on a ship to return him to his parents in Britain. He died off the coast of Madagascar on 4 June 1825. He was buried at sea but he is memorialised within the family tomb in Greyfriars Kirkyard in Edinburgh. A tomb monument to Adam was also erected in 1827 in Cathedral of Calcutta, now known as St. John's Church.

== The John Adam ==
The John Adam was an Indian-built ship of about 580 tons burthen, appointed in 1821 for the accommodation of the mission of John Crawfurd to the Courts of Siam and Cochin China.

== Notes ==
Attribution

This article incorporates text from a publication now in the public domain: Cotton, James Sutherland (1885). "Adam, John". In Stephen, Leslie (ed.). Dictionary of National Biography. Vol. 1. London: Smith, Elder & Co.

Government offices
Preceded by The Earl of Moira	Governor-General of India, acting 1823	Succeeded by The Lord Amherst
