= Andrew Archer, 2nd Baron Archer =

British politician

Andrew Archer, 2nd Baron Archer (29 July 1736 – 18 April 1778), 18th-century British Whig politician, styled the Hon. Andrew Archer between 1747 and 1768.

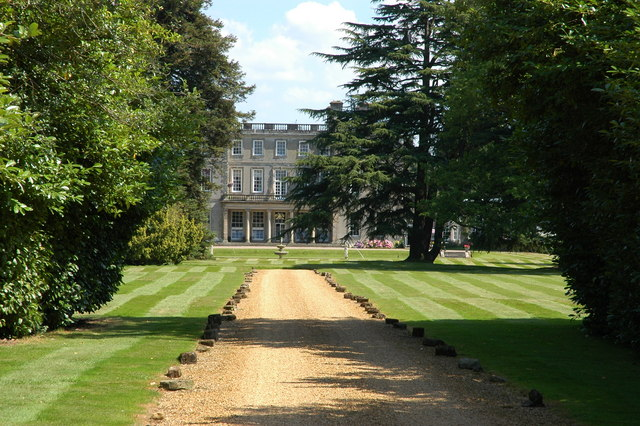
Umberslade Hall, Warwickshire

== Life ==
The son of Thomas, 1st Baron Archer, by Catherine, daughter of Sir Thomas Tipping, 1st Baronet, he was educated at Eton College before going up to Trinity College, Oxford.

In 1761 he was returned to Parliament for both Bramber and Coventry, but chose to sit for Coventry, which he represented until 1768 when he succeeded to his father's title and took his seat in the House of Lords.

He inherited Umberslade Hall near Tanworth and served as Recorder of Coventry from 1769 until his death.

Lord Archer died at Portman Square, Marylebone, London, in April 1778, aged 41, and was buried at the Church of St Mary Magdalene, Tanworth-in-Arden. His monument was sculpted by John Hickey.

He married Sarah, daughter of James West of Alscot Park, in 1761 and had one son and 4 daughters. His son predeceased him and thus the peerage became extinct, but his properties (Umberslade, Pyrgo and a town house in London) were divided between his wife and daughters.

Umberslade eventually passed to Sarah, Countess of Plymouth, who married secondly William, 1st Earl Amherst.

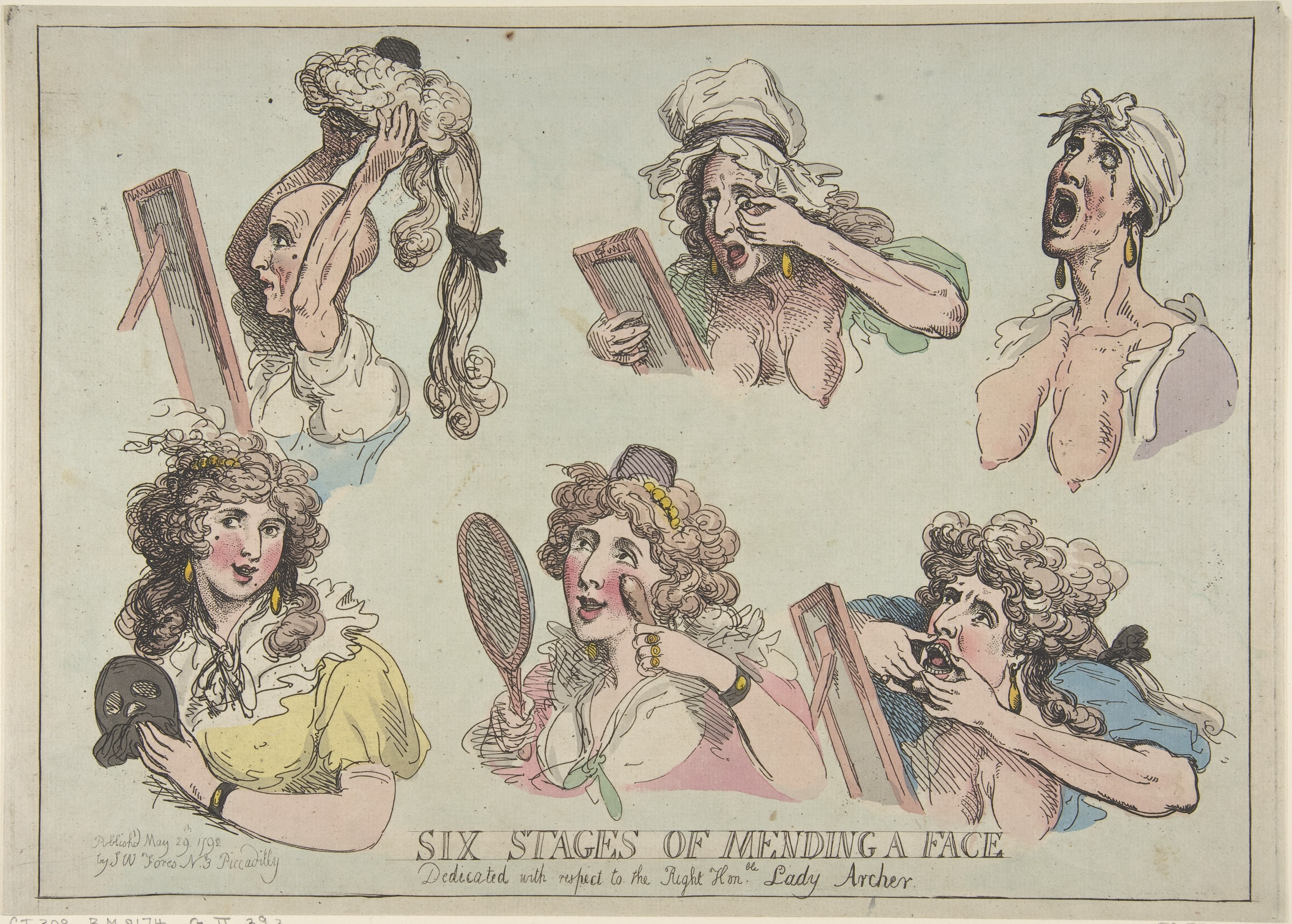
Caricature of Lady Archer, 1792

Lady Archer moved to London with her daughters and living up to being a grand dame then became the subject of a series of malicious caricatures in the press. She died at Charles Street, Grosvenor Square, London, in February 1801, aged 59.

== Ancestry ==
Ancestors of Andrew Archer, 2nd Baron Archer

Sir Simon Archer of Umberslade
Colonel Thomas Archer of Umberslade
Anne Ferrers
Andrew Archer
Richard Leigh of London
Anne Leigh
Thomas Archer of Pirgo, 1st Baron Archer
Francis Dashwood of Vellow Wood
Sir Samuel Dashwood, Lord Mayor of London
Alice Sleigh
Elizabeth Dashwood
John Smith of Tedworth
Anne Smith
Andrew Archer, 2nd Baron Archer
John Tipping of Wheatfield Park
Sir Thomas Tipping "the elder" of Wheatfield Park
Anne Pigott
Sir Thomas Tipping "the younger", 1st Baronet
White or William Beconsaw of Moyles Court, Ellingham
Elizabeth Beconsaw
Edith Bond
Catherine Tipping
Sir Thomas Cheeke of Pirgo
Thomas Cheeke of Pirgo
Essex Rich
Anne Cheeke
Edward Russell
Letitia Russell
Penelope Hill

Parliament of Great Britain
Preceded by William Grove; Samuel Greatheed	Member of Parliament for Coventry; 1761–1768; With: James Hewitt 1761–1766; Henry Seymour-Conway 1766–1768	Succeeded by Henry Seymour-Conway; Sir Richard Glyn, Bt
Peerage of Great Britain
Preceded by Thomas Archer	Baron Archer; 1768–1778	Extinct
