= William Amherst, 1st Earl Amherst =

British diplomat and colonial administrator (1773–1857)

The Right Honourable The Earl Amherst GCH PC
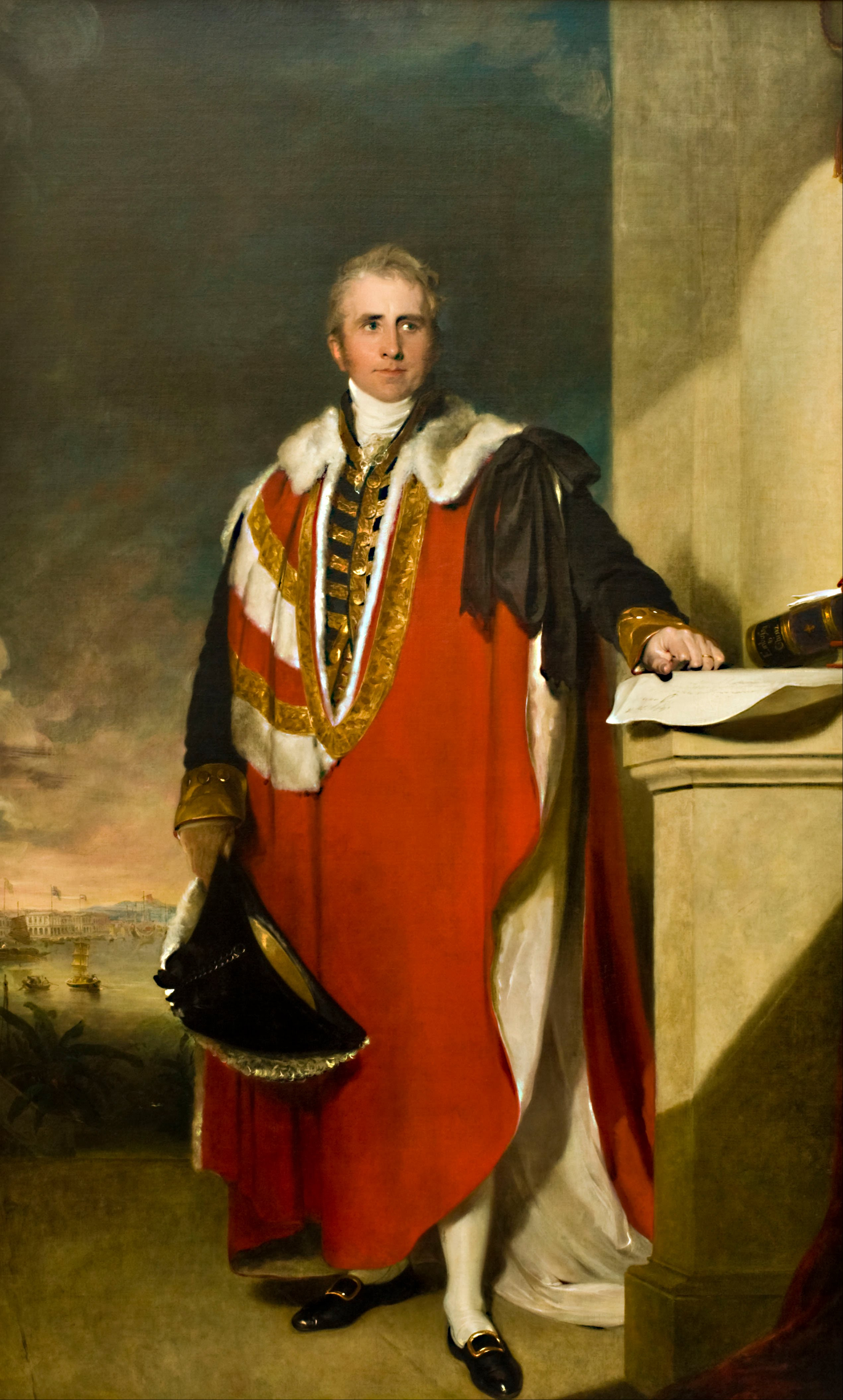
- Portrait by Sir Thomas Lawrence, 1821

Governor-General of the Presidency of Fort William
- In office 1 August 1823 – 13 March 1828
- Monarch: George IV
- Prime Minister: See list: The Earl of Liverpool; George Canning; The Viscount Goderich; The Duke of Wellington
- Preceded by: John Adam (Acting Governor-General)
- Succeeded by: William Butterworth Bayley (Acting Governor-General)

Personal details
- Born: 14 January 1773 Bath, Somerset
- Died: 13 March 1857 (aged 84) Knole House, Kent
- Spouses: Sarah Archer (m. 1800; died 1838) Lady Mary Sackville (m. 1839)
- Children: 4, including Sarah and William
- Parents: William Amherst; Elizabeth Paterson
- Education: Christ Church, Oxford

Military service
- Allegiance: Great Britain; United Kingdom
- Branch/service: British Volunteer Corps
- Years of service: 1797–1801; 1803–1814
- Rank: Colonel
- Commands: St. James's Loyal Volunteers
- Battles/wars: French Revolutionary Wars; Napoleonic Wars

Colonel William Pitt Amherst, 1st Earl Amherst GCH PC (14 January 1773 – 13 March 1857) was a British diplomat, military officer and colonial administrator who served as the Governor-General of the Presidency of Fort William from 1823 to 1828.

== Background and education ==
Born at Bath, Somerset, Amherst was the son of William Amherst and Elizabeth, daughter of Thomas Paterson. He was the grand-nephew of Jeffrey Amherst, 1st Baron Amherst, and succeeded to his title in 1797 according to a special remainder in the letters patent. He matriculated at Christ Church, Oxford on 13 October 1789, receiving a BA in 1793 and an MA in 1797.

== Military career ==
In 1797 Amherst was appointed colonel of the newly raised St. James's Loyal Volunteers, a regiment of the British Volunteer Corps. Though the regiment was disbanded in 1801 due to the imminent Peace of Amiens it was re-raised in June 1803 following the outbreak of the Napoleonic Wars in May of that year, with Amherst once again serving as the regimental colonel. The regiment continued to exist until being disbanded in 1814 with the end of the War of the Sixth Coalition.

== Ambassador extraordinary to China ==
1803 portrait of Amherst by Arthur William Devis

In 1816 he was sent as ambassador extraordinary to the court of China's Qing dynasty, with a view of establishing more satisfactory commercial relations between China and Great Britain. On arriving at Pei Ho (Baihe, today's Haihe), he was given to understand that he could only be admitted to the Jiaqing Emperor's presence on condition of performing the kowtow. To this, Amherst, following the advice of Sir George Thomas Staunton, who accompanied him as second commissioner, refused to consent, as Macartney had done in 1793, unless the admission was made that his sovereign was entitled to the same show of reverence from a mandarin of his rank. After a grueling journey to Peking (Beijing), during which Amherst's party was further delayed when their entry was barred by a closed city gate, Amherst was informed by Qing court officials that he would be immediately received by the emperor upon his arrival. Having had no time to change into his official regalia or prepare his party for the reception, Amherst demurred on account of his unreadiness. Desperate to avoid canceling an audience with the emperor, the Qing ministers insisted that Amherst proceed with the reception even if it meant foregoing the ceremonial kowtow, although such efforts came to naught. Amherst ultimately departed Peking without ever meeting the emperor, his mission having failed to accomplish its goals.

His ship, the Alceste, after a cruise along the coast of Korea and to the Ryukyu Islands on proceeding homewards, was totally wrecked on a submerged rock in Gaspar Strait. Amherst and part of his shipwrecked companions escaped in the ship's boats to Batavia, whence relief was sent to the rest. The ship in which he returned to England in 1817 touched at St Helena and, as a consequence, he had several interviews with the emperor Napoleon (see Ellis's Proceedings of the Late Embassy to China, 1817; McLeod's Narrative of a Voyage in H.M.S. Alceste, 1817). There is undocumented speculation that in one of the interviews, Napoleon said, "China is a sleeping giant. Let her sleep. For when she wakes, she will shake the world."

== Governor-General in India ==
Amherst was Governor-General of India from August 1823 to February 1828. The principal events of his government were the annexation of Assam leading to the First Anglo-Burmese war of 1824, resulting in the cession of Arakan and Tenasserim to the British Empire.

Amherst's appointment came on the heels of the removal of Governor-General Lord Hastings in 1823. Hastings had clashed with London over the issue of lowering the field pay of officers in the Bengal Army, a measure that he was able to avoid through successive wars against Nepal and the Marathan Confederacy. However, his refusal in the early 1820s during peacetime to lower field pay, resulted in the appointment of Amherst, who was expected to carry out the demands from London. However, Amherst was an inexperienced governor who was, at least in the early days of his tenure in Calcutta, influenced heavily by senior military officers in Bengal such as Sir Edward Paget. He inherited a territorial dispute from John Adam, the acting Governor-General prior to his arrival, which involved the Anglo-Burmese border on the Naaf River and this spilled over into violence on 24 September 1823. Unwilling to lose face in a time of Burmese territorial aggression, Amherst ordered the troops in.

The war was to last two years, with a price tag of 13 million pounds, contributing to an economic crisis in India. It was only due to the efforts of powerful friends such as George Canning and the Duke of Wellington that Amherst was not recalled in disgrace at the end of the war. The war significantly changed Amherst's stance on Burma, and he now adamantly refused to annexe Lower Burma, but he did not succeed in repairing his reputation entirely, and he was replaced in 1828. He was created Earl Amherst, of Arracan in the East Indies, and Viscount Holmesdale, in the County of Kent, in 1826. On his return to England, he largely retired from public life, focusing his attention on his Kentish estates until his death in March 1857. Under Robert Peel's first ministry he was to return to imperial politics, being appointed as Governor General of Canada in 1835. Yet the appointment was withdrawn before he could set sail after the collapse of Peel's administration.

== Family ==
Lord Amherst married twice and, remarkably, both his wives were dowager countesses of Plymouth. His first wife was Sarah, Dowager Countess of Plymouth (1762–1838), daughter of Andrew Archer, 2nd Baron Archer and widow of Other Windsor, 5th Earl of Plymouth (died 1799). She was more than ten years older than him, and the mother of several children. They were married in 1800 and had three sons (Jeffrey, William, and Frederick), as well as a daughter Lady Sarah Elizabeth Pitt Amherst. Sarah died in May 1838, aged 76, after about 38 years of marriage. Lady Amherst's pheasant was named after Sarah; it was at her instigation that the species was introduced from Asia to Bedfordshire. The genus Amherstia, a Burmese flowering tree, is also named after her.

In 1839, a year after the death of his first wife, Lord Amherst, aged 66, married the widowed daughter-in-law of his first wife. This was Mary, Dowager Countess of Plymouth (1792–1864), elder daughter and co-heiress of John Sackville, 3rd Duke of Dorset and his wife Arabella Diana Cope. She was also the widow of his stepson Other Windsor, 6th Earl of Plymouth (1789–1833). Although this was an unusual marriage, it was not forbidden by either Church law or civil law. His second wife had no children, from either of her marriages.

Lord Amherst died on 13 March 1857, aged 84 at Knole House in Kent, the seat of the Dukes of Dorset, a property which his second wife had inherited. He was survived by his second wife, Lady Amherst, heiress of Knole, who died on 20 July 1864, aged 71, at Bournemouth. Lord Amherst was succeeded in his titles by his second and only surviving son, William.

== See also ==
- Barrackpore mutiny of 1824
- Amherst Embassy

== Notes ==
Government offices
Preceded by John Adam (acting)	Governor-General of India; 1823–1828	Succeeded by William Butterworth Bayley (acting)
Peerage of Great Britain
Preceded by Jeffrey Amherst	Baron Amherst; 1797–1857	Succeeded by William Pitt Amherst
Peerage of the United Kingdom
New creation	Earl Amherst; 1826–1857	Succeeded by William Pitt Amherst
