= John Hay-Williams =

Welsh High Sheriff

Sir John Hay Williams, 2nd Baronet (9 January 1794 – 10 September 1859) was a descendant of Sir William Williams, who built Bodelwyddan Castle.

He was born at Bodelwyddan, the son of Sir John Williams, 1st Baronet and took by royal licence on 12 May 1842 the name of Hay before that of Williams.

He was in turn High Sheriff of Anglesey (1832), High Sheriff of Flintshire (1836) and High Sheriff of Denbighshire (1839).

Sir John is responsible for the renovation work at Bodelwyddan Castle in the mid-19th century which resulted in the house which stands on the site today.

He married in 1842 Lady Sarah Elizabeth Pitt Amherst, the daughter of William Amherst, 1st Earl Amherst. One of their children was Margaret Maria, later the wife of Sir Edmund Hope Verney. He was succeeded by his brother, Sir Hugh Williams, 3rd Baronet.

Honorary titles
Preceded by Owen Owen	High Sheriff of Anglesey; 1832	Succeeded by Charles Henry Evans
Preceded by Charles Roper	High Sheriff of Flintshire; 1836	Succeeded by Edward Mostyn
Preceded by Samuel Sandbach	High Sheriff of Denbighshire; 1839	Succeeded by Townshend Mainwaring
Baronetage of Great Britain
Preceded by John Williams	Baronet (of Bodelwyddan); 1830–1859	Succeeded by Hugh Williams
