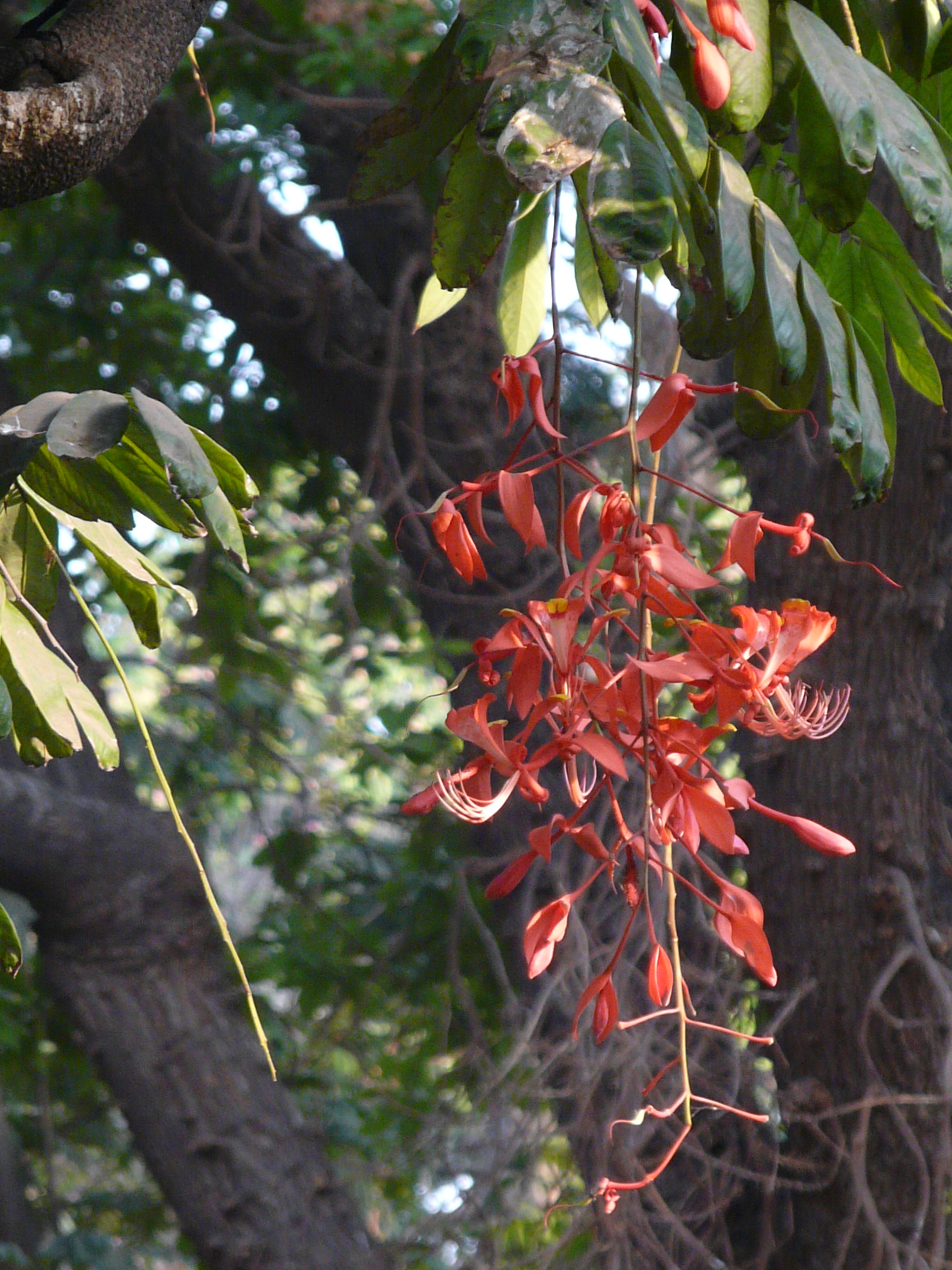
- Flowers on a cultivated specimen in India

Conservation status
- Extinct in the Wild (IUCN 3.1)

Scientific classification
- Kingdom: Plantae
- Clade: Tracheophytes
- Clade: Angiosperms
- Clade: Eudicots
- Clade: Rosids
- Order: Fabales
- Family: Fabaceae
- Subfamily: Detarioideae
- Tribe: Amherstieae
- Genus: Amherstia; Wall.
- Species: A. nobilis

Binomial name
- Amherstia nobilis Wall.
- It was native to Myanmar but is now extinct in the wild.

= Amherstia =

Monotypic genus of legumes

Amherstia nobilis (Burmese: သော်ကကြီး [θɔ̀ka̰ dʑí]; the Pride of Burma) is a tropical tree growing to about 15 metres (49 ft) in height with large, showy flowers. It is the only member of the genus Amherstia. It is widely cultivated for ornament in the humid tropics, but is extinct in the wild, only being known from a single wild specimen which was recorded in 1865. It is thus potentially endemic in Burma (Myanmar), hence the common name, though Plants of the World Online also cites it as native in adjoining Thailand. The scientific name commemorates Lady Amherst, (as does Lady Amherst's pheasant) and also her daughter Sarah. Another common name, orchid tree, is also used for members of the genus Bauhinia.

== Description ==
The extravagant flowers are seen hanging from the metre-long pendent inflorescence, or flower stalk, which is a bright crimson red at the end. There are 5 petals although 2 of these are minute and the rest are of unequal size. These petals are also crimson; the two medium-sized petals are yellow at the tip and the largest petal is broad and fan-shaped with a wavy upper margin and a yellow triangle of colour extending from the lip down into the flower. This large petal can reach 7.5 cm (3.0 in) long and over 4 cm (1.6 in) wide at the end. There are either 9 or 10 stamens, 9 of which are partially fused into a pink sheath; the stamens are of two differing lengths with the longer ones having larger anthers. The compound leaves bear six to eight large leaflets; these are broadly oblong in shape and are pallid underneath.

The fruit, a legume, is a pod 11 to 20 cm (4.3 to 7.9 in) long. The pods are roughly scimitar-shaped, and the woody outer case opens to disperse the seeds.

== Gallery ==
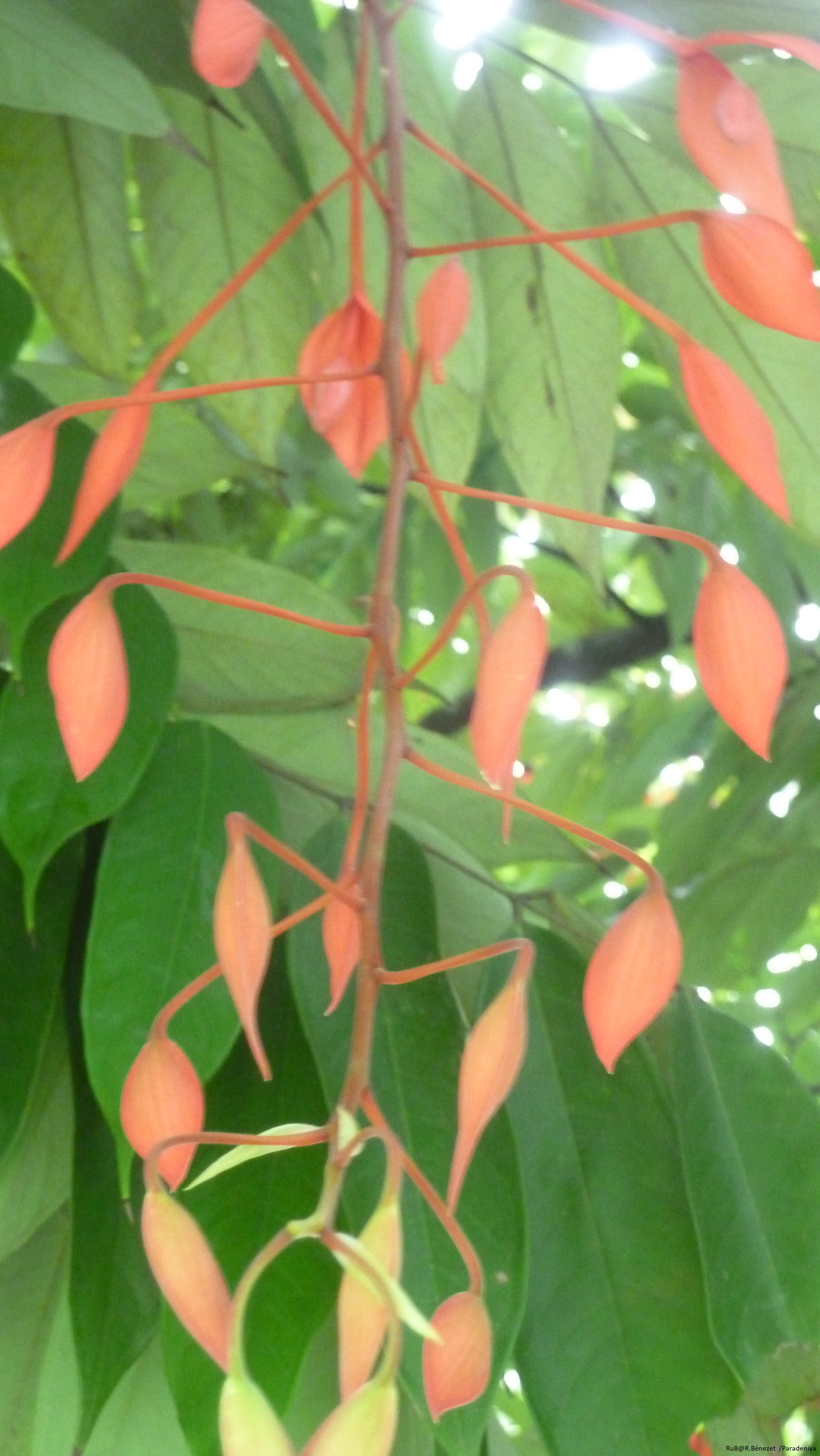
Amherstia nobilis beginning of the inflorescence

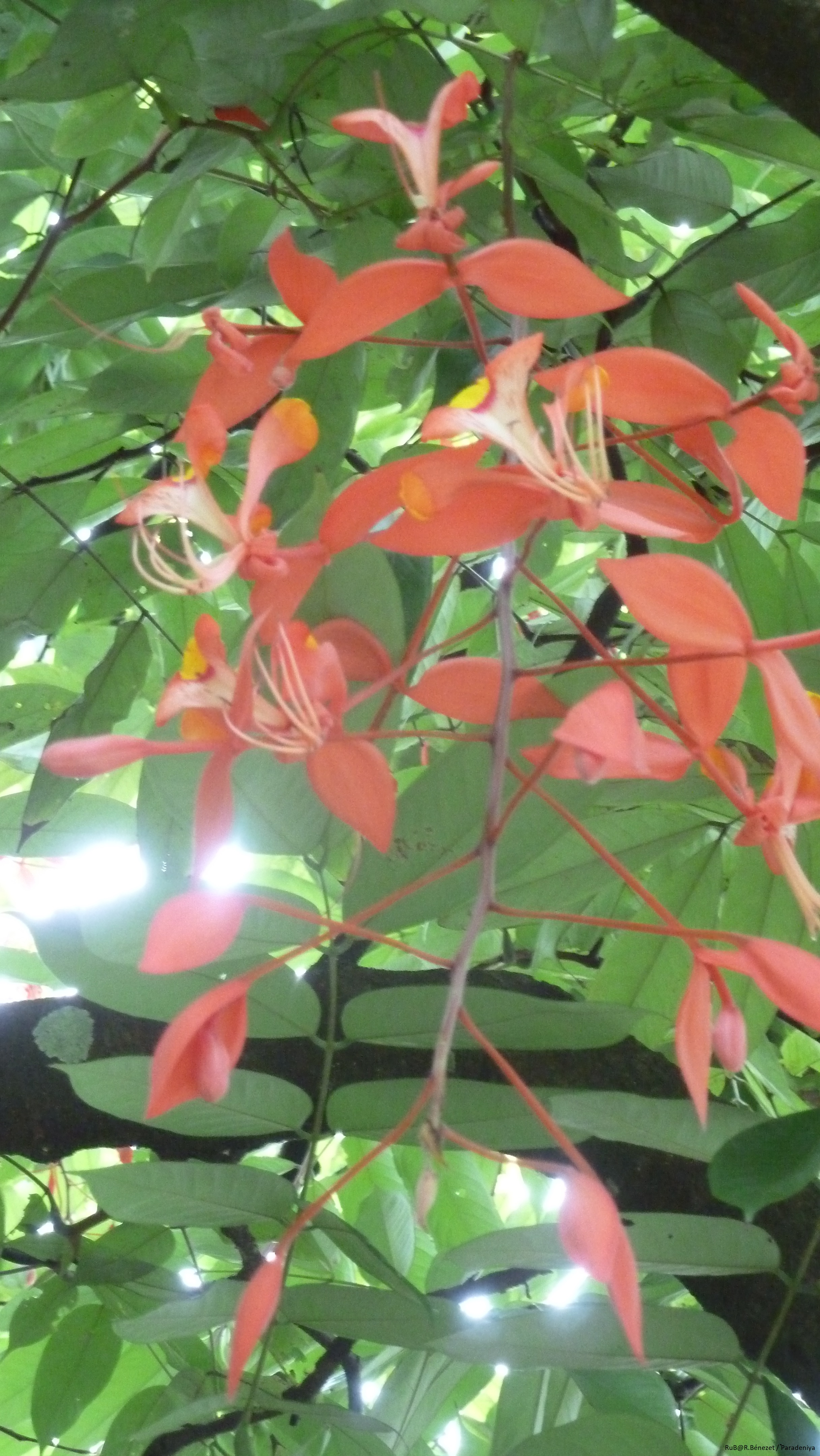
Amherstia nobilis flowering

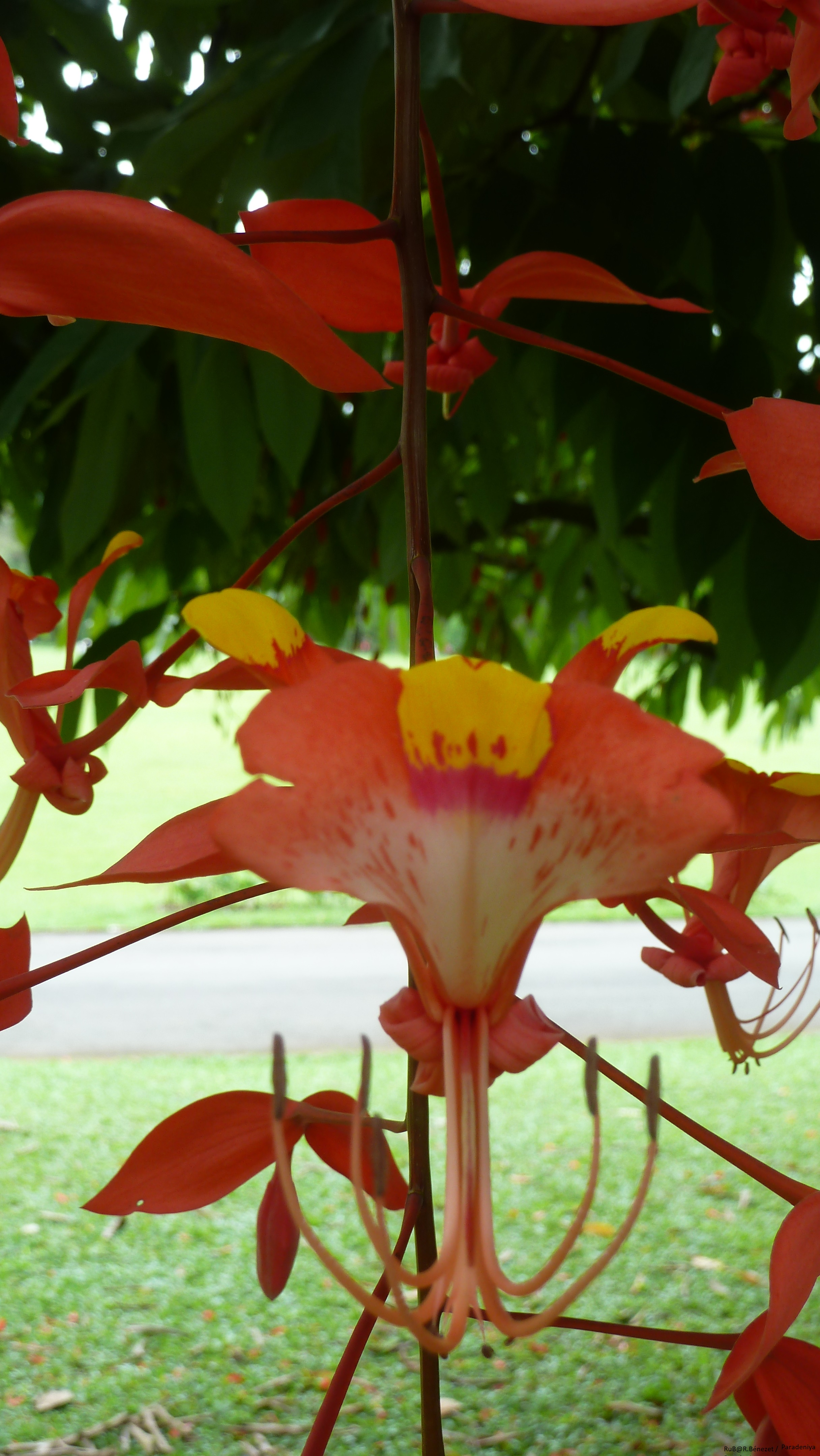
Amherstia nobilis detail of the flower

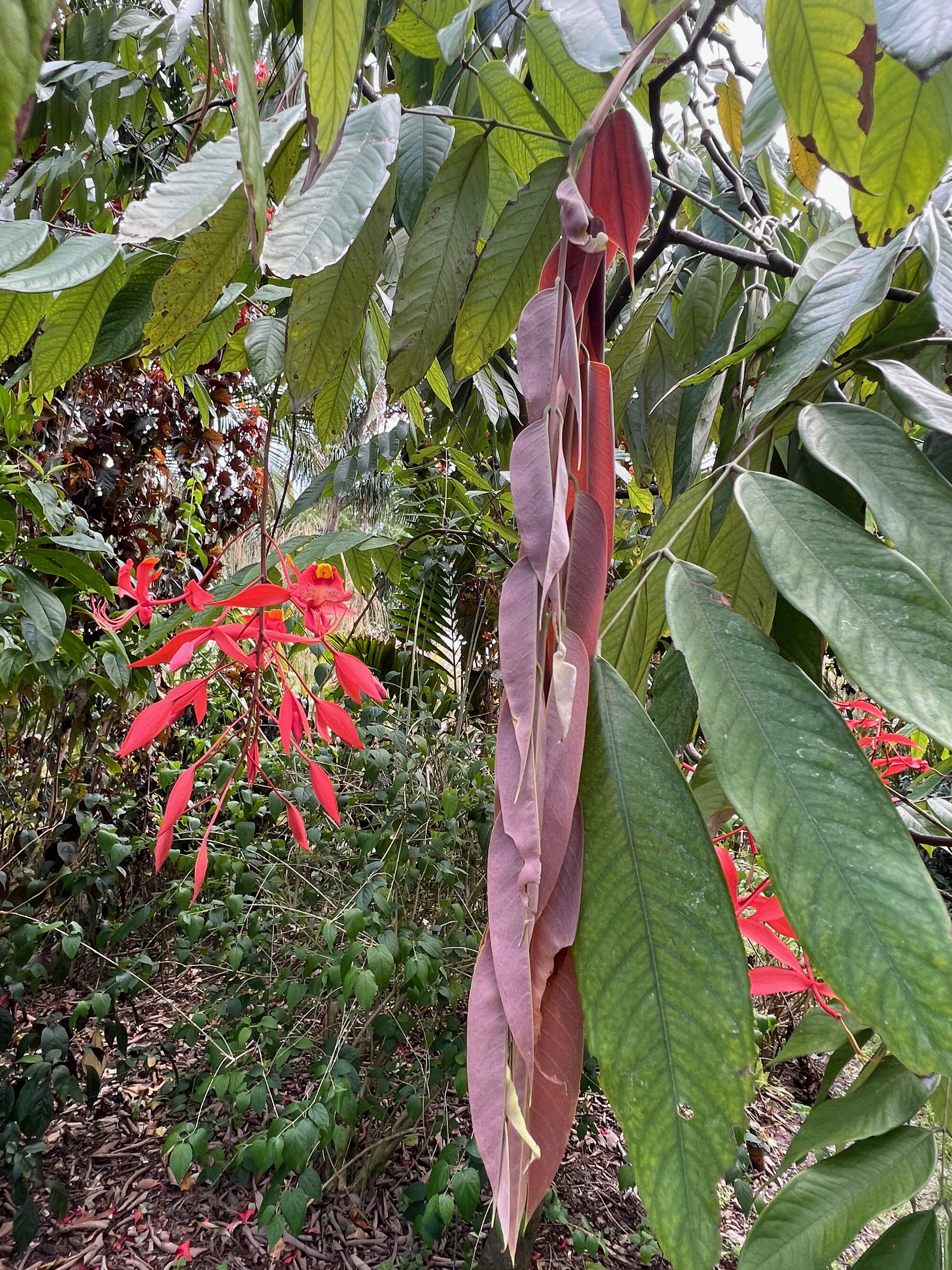
Flower, new red leaves, and mature green leaves

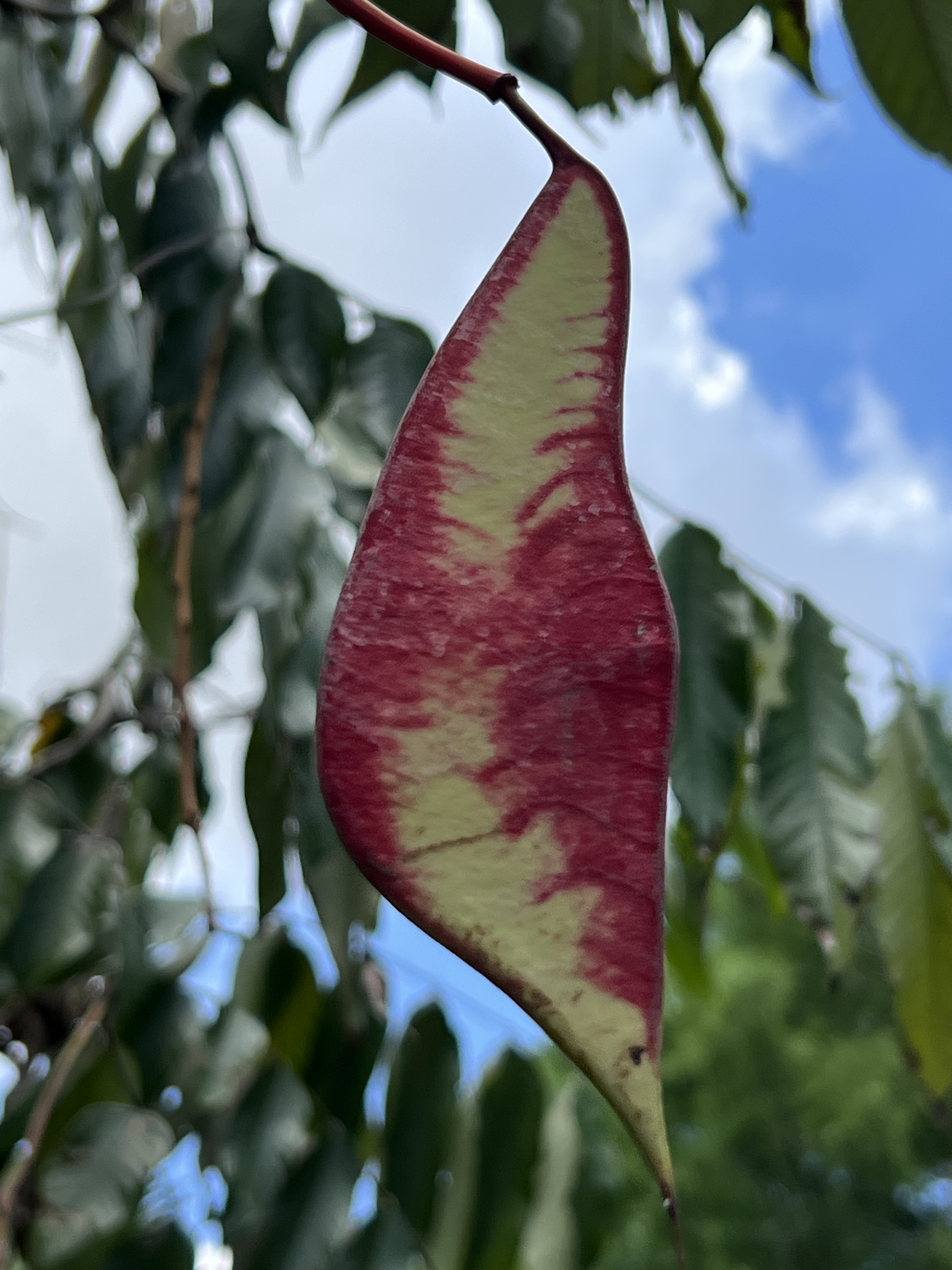
Seedpod

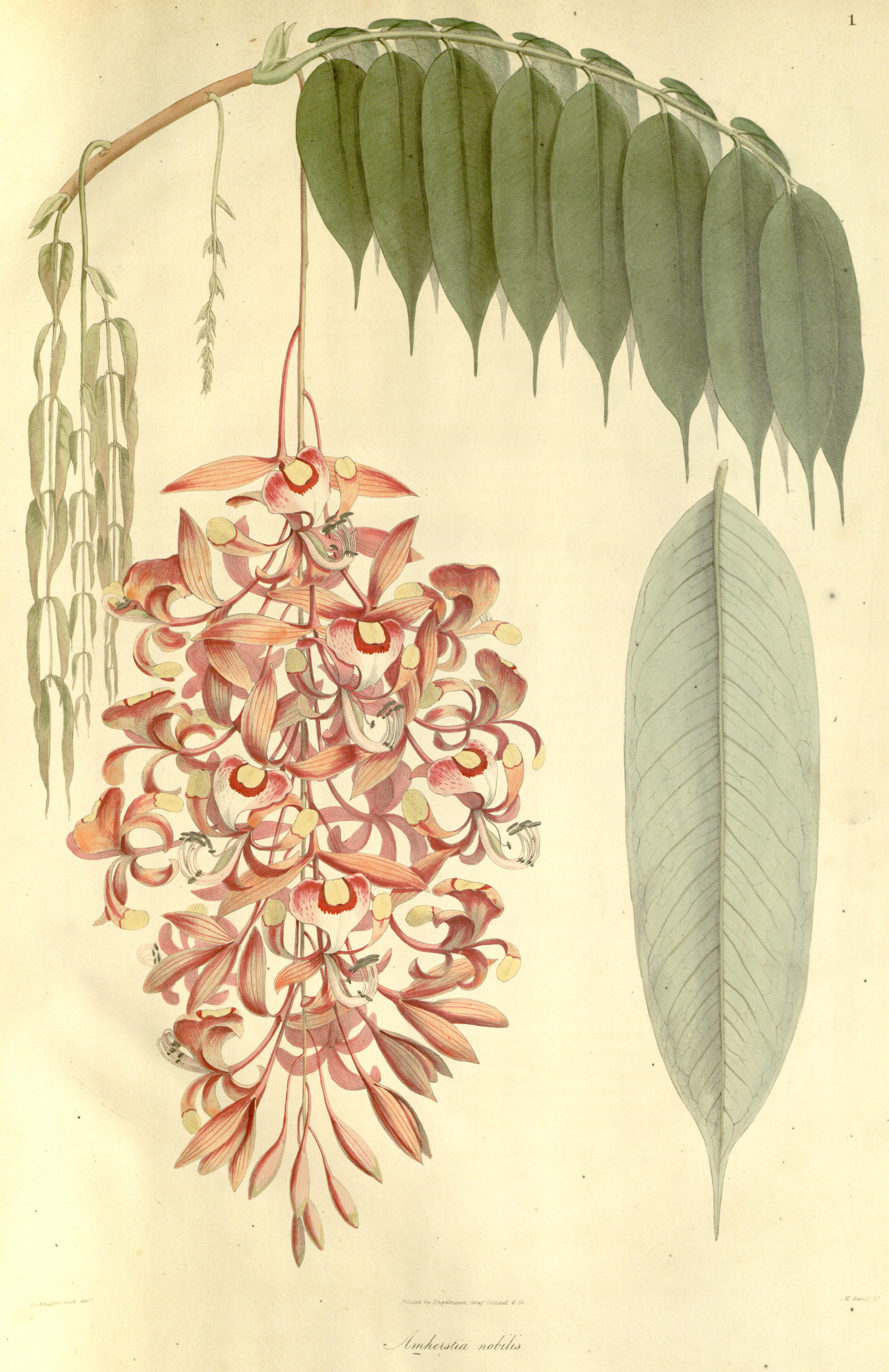
Illustration
