= Jill McDonald =

Children's writer and illustrator

- Born: 30 October 1927; Wellington, New Zealand
- Died: 2 January 1982 (aged 54); London, England
- Occupation(s): children's writer and illustrator
- Known for: her work for Puffin Books
- Relatives: Reginald Bedford Hammond (father)

Jill Masefield McDonald (née Hammond; 30 October 1927 – 2 January 1982) was a New-Zealand-born children's writer and illustrator, working in the United Kingdom from the mid-1960s. Much of her work was done for Puffin Books, the children's imprint of Penguin, and for its club's magazine Puffin Post.

== Life ==
She was born in Wellington, New Zealand in 1927. Her father was Reginald Bedford Hammond, a distant cousin of John Masefield. She initially trained as an architect, but turned to illustration following her marriage, becoming art editor of the New Zealand School Journal.

In 1965 she moved to England with her two children. There she worked for Puffin Books, the children's imprint of Penguin. Much of her work was on Puffin Post, the members' magazine of the Puffin Club, launched in 1967, whose visual style she shaped. In addition to the cover designs, her contributions included a regular column in which Odway, a philosophical dog, invited responses from readers. In McDonald's Times obituary, Kaye Webb, the editor of Puffin Books wrote of her work:

everyone who knows it has been captivated not only by her brilliant use of colour and unique style, but the way each sure, strong line seems to impose a very individual and secret humour.

She was the author of twelve picture books for children.

She died in London on 2 January 1982.

== Selected works ==
=== As writer and illustrator ===
- Maggy Scraggle Loves the Beautiful Ice-cream Man (1978) Harmondsworth: Kestrel Books ISBN 978-0-7226-5313-5
- Counting on an Elephant (1975) Harmondsworth : Kestrel Books ISBN 978-0-7226-6795-8
- The Happyhelper Engine (1980) London: Methuen Children's Books ISBN 978-0-416-89240-6

=== As illustrator ===
- Aitchison, Janet (1970), The Pirates' Tale Harmondsworth: Penguin (Picture Puffin) ISBN 978-0-14-050026-4
- Cash, Alan (1966), The Puffin Crossword Puzzle Book Harmondsworth: Penguin Books (Puffin)
- Cunliffe, John (1971), Farmer Barnes and the Goats London: Collins ISBN 978-0-233-96235-1
- Greaves, Margaret (1966), Your Turn Next London: Methuen Educational; (1973 edn): ISBN 978-0-423-88180-6
- Greaves, Margaret (1968), Gallery London: Methuen Educational
- Greaves, Margaret (ed.) (1969), Scrap-box: Poems for Grown-ups to Share with Children London: Methuen
- Greaves, Margaret (1971), The Snowman of Biddle (Gallimaufry 1) London: Methuen Educational ISBN 978-0-416-65300-7
- Greaves, Margaret (1971), The Rainbow Sun (Gallimaufry 2) London: Methuen ISBN 978-0-416-65310-6
- Greaves, Margaret (1971), King Solomon and the Hoopoes (Gallimaufry 3) London: Methuen ISBN 978-0-416-65320-5
- Greaves, Margaret (1971), The Great Bell of Peking (Gallimaufry 4) London: Methuen ISBN 978-0-416-65330-4
- Greaves, Margaret (1971), The Dagger and the Bird London: Methuen ISBN 978-0-416-16900-3
- Greaves, Margaret (1972), Two at Number 20 London: Methuen ISBN 978-0-423-87380-1
- Greaves, Margaret (1973), Little Jacko and the Wolf People London: Methuen ISBN 978-0-416-65930-6
- Hunter, Norman (1974), Norman Hunter's Book of Magic London: Bodley Head ISBN 978-0-370-01594-1
- Hunter, Norman (1976), Professor Branestawm’s Do-it-yourself Handbook London: Bodley Head ISBN 978-0-370-10847-6; (1979) Harmondsworth: Penguin Books (Puffin) ISBN 978-0-14-031148-8
- Hunter, Norman (1978), Vanishing Ladies, and Other Magic London: Bodley Head ISBN 978-0-370-30078-8
- Hunter, Norman, (1980) ISBN 978-0-370-30362-8, The Best of Branestawm London: Bodley Head, with illustrations by George Adamson, Derek Cousins, W. Heath Robinson and Jill McDonald
- Sloan, Carolyn (1974), The Penguin and the Vacuum Cleaner. Harmondsworth: Penguin (Puffin) ISBN 978-0-582-15320-2
- Turnbull, Michael Robert McGregor (1960), The Changing Land: A Short History of New Zealand for Children London: Longman
- Waters, John F. (1972) The Royal Potwasher London: Methuen
