= Norman Hunter (writer) =

British children's author (1899–1995)

- Born: 23 November 1899; Sydenham, London, England
- Died: 23 February 1995 (aged 95); Staines, Surrey, England
- Occupation: Children's writer
- Known for: Professor Branestawm
- Spouse: Sylvia Rangel (married 1923)
- Children: Mary Sylvia Grosch, Barbara Cecelia Bowden, John Phillip Hunter
- Parent(s): Joseph Hunter, Minnie Elizabeth Smith

Norman George Lorimer Hunter (23 November 1899 – 23 February 1995) was a British writer of children's literature. He is particularly known for creating the Professor Branestawm book series.

== Early life ==
Hunter was born in Sydenham, England, on 23 November 1899. He attended Beckenham County School for Boys (later known as Beckenham and Penge Grammar School and then Langley Park School for Boys). He had three siblings, Edith Mira Hunter, Gladys Minnie Hunter and Cyril Joseph Hunter. His father died when he was 9 and his brother, Cyril was killed in the First World War in Flanders, France. Hunter left school to volunteer for service in the London Irish Rifles in the First World War. He was awarded the British War Medal and Victory Medal for his service.

== Career ==
After the First World War Hunter became an advertising copywriter. In the 1930s he performed as a stage magician in Bournemouth and in the London Magic Theatre of John Nevil Maskelyne and David Devant. He was also a member of The Magic Circle. Hunter wrote popular books on writing for advertising, brain-teasers and conjuring, among many other topics, but his best-known works were about the character Professor Branestawm, originally written for radio. The first book, The Incredible Adventures of Professor Branestawm, was published in hardback in 1933 with illustrations by W. Heath Robinson; the second, Professor Branestawm's Treasure Hunt in 1937 with drawings by James Arnold. George Adamson illustrated the reissue of Professor Branestawm's Treasure Hunt in 1966, and when Norman Hunter brought out his third book in the series in 1970 after a gap of more than thirty years, Adamson provided the illustrations. Two further Professor Branestawm titles were then published with Adamson's drawings. Other artists were to provide illustrations for later books in the series: Gerald Rose; David Hughes; Jill McDonald, and Derek Cousins. Many of the books were reissued in Puffin Books, The Incredible Adventures of Professor Branestawm under Eleanor Graham's editorship in 1946, and many others under Kaye Webb's in the 1960s and 1970s.

Having worked as an advertising manager for a Department Store in Bournemouth, Hunter returned to London during the Second World War and worked for the Advertising Agency, S.H. Benson as a copywriter. In 1949 he emigrated to South Africa on the Cape Town Castle. He was employed as chief copywriter for P.N. Barrett & Co from 1949 to 1959 and then Central Advertising from 1959 to 1970, both in Johannesburg. After his retirement in 1970, he once again returned to Staines, London, where Thames Television had just produced an eight-part TV series, Professor Branestawm. He continued writing in his retirement, up until the age of 86 and his last book was published in 1983.

== Personal life ==
Norman Hunter married Sylvia Maria Rangel in 1923 in Edmonton, Middlesex, and they had three children. In about 1934 the family moved to Dorset and lived in various homes in and around Bournemouth. The family then moved to London during the Second World War at the beginning of The Blitz. Hunter and his family, together with their Bullmastiff called Midas, ended up living in a single room in Amersham. They relocated to Chalfont St Giles in Buckinghamshire, and then to Bromley, Kent to avoid the bombings. During their stay in Bromley, known as “Bomb Alley” the V-1 flying bomb and V-2 rocket, started coming from Germany aimed at London. However, they sometimes fell short and crashed in Kent. One night a V-1 landed in the Bromley shopping area. The blast fanned outward and did a lot of damage, including to the side of the family's rented house. As there was a shortage of accommodation at the end of the Second World War, Hunter lived on a boat on the River Thames with his family. In 1949 the family emigrated to South Africa. Hunter was 49 at the time. He lived in South Africa until his retirement when he returned with his wife, Sylvia to England. They lived in Staines, London where Hunter continued to write children's books and work on a model theatre, a replica of the Theatre Royal, Drury Lane. This model theatre is now housed at the University of Bristol Theatre Collection. Hunter was also a member of the Savage Club. His wife died in 1982 and he continued to live in Staines until his death on 23 February 1995.

== Works ==
(Complete):

- Simplified Conjuring for All: a collection of new tricks needing no special skill or apparatus for their performance with suitable patter, C. Arthur Pearson (1923), new edition published by Hamlyn (1999)
- Advertising Through the Press: a guide to press publicity, Sir I. Pitman & Sons (1925)
- New and Easy Magic : a further series of novel magical experiments needing no special skill or apparatus for their performance with suitable patter, C. Arthur Pearson (1925)
- Hey Presto: A Book of Effects for Conjurers, Edward Bagshawe (1931)
- The Bad Barons of Crashbania: Vol. 42, Continuous Stories, Jolly Books (Blackwell, 1932), illustrated by Eve Garnett
- The Incredible Adventures of Professor Branestawm, John Lane, The Bodley Head (1933), first appeared in The Merry-Go-Round (April to October 1929 - 5 issues), Basil Blackwell (1929); Penguin Books, Puffin Books (1946; 1969; 1973); The Bodley Head (1965; 1988); Penguin Red Fox (2008; 2011); Penguin Random House, Vintage Children's Classics (2013), illustrated by W. Heath Robinson
- New Conjuring without Skill, The Bodley Head (1935)
- Professor Branestawm's Treasure Hunt, John Lane, The Bodley Head (1937); Puffin Books (1966), illustrated by George Adamson
- Larky Legends (1938), republished as The Dribblesome Teapots and Other Incredible Stories, The Bodley Head (1969)
- Successful Conjuring for Amateurs, Pearson (1951)
- The Puffin Book of Magic, Puffin Books (1968; 1970; 1973), illustrated by Jill McDonald, republished as Norman Hunter's Book of Magic, The Bodley Head (1974)
- Magic tricks, Penguin Books, Puffin Books (1968; 1972), illustrated by Jill McDonald, formerly The Puffin Book of Magic, Puffin Books (1968)
- The Dribblesome Teapots and Other Incredible Stories, The Bodley Head (1969); Puffin Books (1971); Penguin Red Fox Classics (2013), illustrated by Fritz Wegner
- The Peculiar Triumph of Professor Branestawm, The Bodley Head (1970); Puffin Books (1970); Penguin Red Fox (2012), illustrated by George Adamson
- The Home Made Dragon, The Bodley Head (1971), illustrated by Fritz Wegner
- Professor Branestawm Up the Pole, The Bodley Head (1972); Puffin Books (1972), illustrated by George Adamson
- Professor Branestawm's Dictionary, The Bodley Head (1973), illustrated by Derek Cousins
- Professor Branestawm's Dictionary, Puffin Books (1974), illustrated by Derek Cousins, with cover by George Adamson
- The Frantic Phantom and Other Incredible Stories, Random House (1973); Puffin Books (1976), illustrated by Geraldine Spence
- Wizards Are A Nuisance, BBC Books (1973), illustrated by Quentin Blake
- Norman Hunter's Book of magic, The Bodley Head (1974), illustrated by Jill McDonald
- Professor Branestawm's Great Revolution, The Bodley Head (1974), illustrated by David Hughes; Puffin (1977), illustrated by George Adamson
- The Home-made Dragon and Other Incredible Stories, Puffin Books (1974), illustrated by Fritz Wegner
- Long Live Their Majesties, Blackie and Son Limited (1975), illustrated by Sara Silcock
- Dust up at the Royal Disco: and Other Stories, Puffin / Penguin (1975; 1978), illustrated by Fritz Wegner
- Professor Branestawm's Do-It-Yourself Handbook, The Bodley Head (1976) ISBN 978-0-370-10847-6; Puffin (1979) ISBN 978-0-14-031148-8, illustrated by Jill McDonald
- Professor Branestawm's Compendium of Conundrums, Riddles, Puzzles, Brain Twiddlers and Dotty Descriptions, The Bodley Head (1975); Puffin Books (1977), illustrated by Derek Cousins
- Professor Branestawm Round the Bend, The Bodley Head (1977); Puffin Books (1980), illustrated by Derek Cousins
- Vanishing Ladies, and Other Magic, The Bodley Head (1978) ISBN 978-0-370-30078-8, illustrated by Jill McDonald
- Count Bakwerdz on the Carpet, The Bodley Head (1979); Puffin Books (1982), illustrated by Babette Cole.
- Professor Branestawm's Perilous Pudding, The Bodley Head (1979); Puffin Books (1983), illustrated by Derek Cousins
- The Best of Branestawm, The Bodley Head (1980), illustrated by George Adamson, Derek Cousins, W. Heath Robinson and Jill McDonald
- Sneeze and Be Slain and Other Incredible Stories, The Bodley Head (1980), illustrated by Babette Cole
- Professor Branestawm and the Wild Letters, The Bodley Head (1981), illustrated by Gerald Rose
- Professor Branestawm's Pocket Motor Car, The Bodley Head (1981), combined edition of Professor Branestawm's Pocket Motor Car & Professor Branestawm And the Wild Letters, Penguin Random House / Puffin Books (1982), illustrated by Gerald Rose
- Professor Branestawm's Mouse War, The Bodley Head (1982); Penguin (Young Puffin Books) (1984), illustrated by Gerald Rose
- Professor Branestawm's Building Bust-Up, The Bodley Head (1982), illustrated by Gerald Rose
- Professor Branestawm's Crunchy Crockery, The Bodley Head (1983) combined edition of Professor Branestawm's Crunchy Crockery And Professor Branestawm's HairRaising Idea (Young Puffin Read Alone Series), Puffin Books (1994), illustrated by Gerald Rose
- Professor Branestawm's Hair-Raising Idea, The Bodley Head (1983), illustrated by Gerald Rose
- Professor Branestawm Stories, Penguin Red Fox (2000; 2017), illustrated by W. Heath Robinson and others

== Adaptations ==
Jackanory. Kenneth Williams read ' The Dribblesome Teapots' . Broadcast: Mon., 20th Nov.1978, BBC One.
