= George Worsley Adamson =

American British illustrator and cartoonist

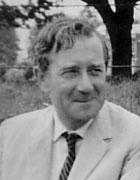
- Adamson in 1966
- Born: 7 February 1913; New York City, U.S.
- Died: 5 March 2005 (aged 92); Exeter, Devon, England
- Occupations: Illustrator and cartoonist
- Spouse: Mary Marguerita Renée Diamond
- Website: www.georgewadamson.com

George Worsley Adamson (7 February 1913 – 5 March 2005) was a book illustrator, writer, and cartoonist, who held American and British dual citizenship from 1931.

== Early life ==
Adamson was born in the Bronx, New York City. His parents were George William Adamson, a master car builder for the Interborough Rapid Transit Company, and Mary Lydia (Lily, née Howard). His father, born in Glasgow, Scotland, and his mother, born in Wigan, Lancashire, had moved to New York City from Bombay in 1910.

Following the death of his mother in February 1921, George Adamson sailed to England with his father, his Aunt Florence, and his two sisters, Marie and Dorothy, on the Cunard liner RMS Caronia, landing at Liverpool on July 10. His father sailed back to New York in October 1921, where he died the following year.

George Adamson was educated at the Wigan Mining and Technical College and the Liverpool City School of Art, where he studied etching and engraving under Geoffrey Wedgwood RE.

He exhibited at the Royal Academy (in 1937, 1939, 1940 and 1948) and contributed to Punch from 1939 to 1988.

== World War II ==
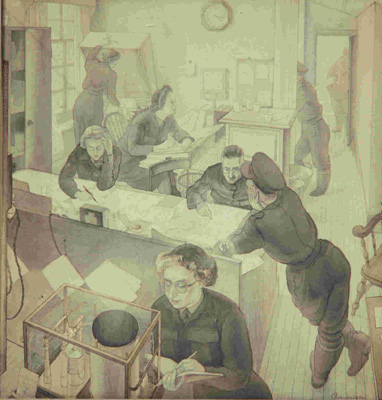
Meteorological office, Pembroke Dock (1943) FA03031 Air Historical Branch (AHB)

During World War II, Adamson served with the RAF Coastal Command as a navigator in Catalina flying boats on the Western Approaches and trained on B-24 Liberators in the Bahamas. After he illustrated a feature on transatlantic flights for the Illustrated London News, he was appointed an official war artist for the Coastal Command. Some of Adamson's drawings are now in the Imperial War Museum and the RAF Museum.

== Career ==
Between 1946 and 1953 Adamson taught engraving and illustration at Exeter School of Art, Exeter, Devon.

In 1954 he worked briefly in London with the designer John Morgan for the newly formed design group Byrne and Woudhuysen Limited (later Woudhuysen & Company Ltd), before setting himself up as a full-time illustrator and cartoonist.

=== Illustrator ===
The first book for which he did the drawings and dust-wrapper was Marjorie Vasey's The Day is Over (Epworth Press, 1954).

From the mid-1960s he illustrated Norman Hunter's Professor Branestawm books, providing a suitably zany continuity with W. Heath Robinson's illustrations from the 1930s. Also in the 1960s, Adamson painted the jackets for Alan Garner's first two novels for children: The Weirdstone of Brisingamen (1960) and The Moon of Gomrath (1963). In the same decade Adamson did the drawings for the first book of poems Ted Hughes wrote for children: Meet My Folks! (1961); this was followed by the drawings he did for Ted Hughes's first book of children's stories, How the Whale Became (1963), and those for the first edition of The Iron Man (1968).

In 1970, Adamson illustrated the book based on Richard Carpenter's television series Catweazle; this was followed in 1971 by the drawings he did for the book based on the second series, Catweazle and the Magic Zodiac. In the 1980s, he illustrated the first five of the Richard Ingrams and John Wells Dear Bill books for Private Eye.

Besides work for books, Adamson undertook commissions to illustrate articles in periodicals, among them the Listener and Nursing Times. For the latter he drew more than two hundred illustrations between 1963 and 1983.

=== Cartoonist ===
Adamson published his first cartoon in Punch in September 1939 and his last in the Spectator in September 1994. Over the intervening fifty-five years his cartoons appeared not just in Punch but in the Tatler and Bystander, Time & Tide, the Peterborough column in the Daily Telegraph, Private Eye and other magazines.

One of the last things that happened under Hollowood's editorship was that Punch accepted a cover by George Adamson which showed Mr Punch sitting at an easel in the middle of a stretch of English countryside. Beside him was a book called How to Paint Like the Great Masters, and the landscape which Mr Punch was trying to paint was in fact modelled on the great masters… the Van Gogh trees on the right merged into a Samuel Palmer hillside, then into a Gainsborough or Constable field.

To make the landscape itself look like a collaboration between the masters was a brilliant idea.

George did it brilliantly and we all thought it was a brilliant cover. One of the first actions by the new editor, William Davis, was to reject the cover. He didn't understand it. Or, if he did understand it, he didn't think it was funny. Or, if he thought it was funny, he didn't think enough other people would find it was funny. No, let's face it; he didn't understand it.

— Miles Kington, The Punch Cartoon Album: 150 Years of Classic Cartoons.

=== Engraver and etcher ===
At Liverpool City School of Art, Adamson developed what became a lifelong fascination with fine printing, especially dry-point, soft-ground etching and aquatint. In the early years after World War II he undertook several etchings for his own delight while teaching at Exeter School of Art.

Between his portrait of his two-year-old son Peter One Morning (completed in 1950) and Killerton from the North (1979), however, there was a gap of many years during which he pursued his career as illustrator and cartoonist. He went back to printmaking with great enthusiasm in the late 1970s, exhibiting his works both new and old at the Royal Society of Painter-Etchers and Engravers. Among his later prints are portraits of John Ogdon (1979) and Patricia Beer (1982).

== Work in public collections ==
George Adamson's work is held in several public collections, including the following:

- Ashmolean Museum, Oxford (etching on loan from the Royal Society of Painter-Printmakers)
- British Museum, London
- House of Humor and Satire, Gabrovo, Bulgaria
- Imperial War Museum, London
- New York Public Library, New York
- Oxford Brookes University Library, Oxford (drawing in André Deutsch Collection)
- Royal Air Force Museum, Hendon
- Royal Albert Memorial Museum, Exeter
- Ulster Museum, Belfast
- Victoria and Albert Museum, London
- Wigan Heritage Service, Wigan

== Selected works ==
=== Books written and illustrated ===
- A Finding Alphabet (Faber & Faber, 1965)
- Finding 1 to 10 (Faber & Faber, 1967)
- Rome Done Lightly (Chatto & Windus, 1972)

=== Books illustrated ===
This includes work as interior and cover illustrator.

- Marjorie Vasey The Day is Over (Epworth Press, 1954)
- Donald Herbert Barber Family Affairs (Epworth Press, 1954)
- Bertita Leonarz de Harding Magic Fire: The Story of Wagner's Life and Music (Harrap, 1954)
- Barbara Ireson (ed.) Nursery Nonsense (Faber & Faber, 1956)
- Hans Habe [János Békessy], transl.from the German by Ewald Osers Off Limits: a novel of occupied Germany (Harrap, 1956)
- James Baggaley Shadow of the Eagle (Harrap, 1956)
- Ronald Ridout Word Perfect (Ginn, 1957–1960)
- Gladys Staines (ed.) Twelve Little Plays (Ginn, 1957)
- Charles Kingsley (ed. M. W. & G. Thomas) Westward Ho! (Ginn, 1957)
- Vera Caspary The Husband (W.H. Allen, 1957)
- James Baggaley The Spare Men (Harrap, 1958)
- Barbara Ireson (ed.) The Faber Book of Nursery Verse (Faber & Faber, 1958)
- "Mr George Adamson am y darluniau" Second Stages in Welsh, summer term 1959 (BBC Broadcasts to Schools, 1959)
- W. H. Wood Crown of Gold (Thomas Nelson, 1959)
- W. H. Wood Perils of Pacifico (Brockhampton Press, 1959)
- Frank Yerby The Serpent and the Staff (Heinemann, 1959)
- Compton Mackenzie Hunting the Fairies (Penguin, 1959)
- Compton Mackenzie Monarch of the Glen (Penguin, 1959)
- Compton Mackenzie The Rival Monster (Penguin, 1959)
- Compton Mackenzie Water on the Brain (Penguin, 1959)
- Compton Mackenzie Thin Ice (Penguin, 1959)
- A. Elliott Cannon Silver City (Wheaton, 1959)
- A. Elliott Cannon A Question of Identity (Wheaton, 1959)
- Druce Raven Let's Go Camping! (Nelson, 1959)
- William Appleby Singing Together (BBC Schools, 1960)
- Willis Hall The Royal Astrologer: adventures of Father Mole-Cricket of the Malayan legends (Heinemann, 1959)
- W. H. Wood Perils of Pacifico (Franklin Watts, New York, 1960)
- Alan Garner The Weirdstone of Brisingamen (Collins, 1960)
- John Sibly You'll Walk to Mandalay (Jonathan Cape, 1960)
- Austin Stevens On the Market (Jonathan Cape, 1960)
- Austin Lee Miss Hogg and the Covent Garden Murders (Jonathan Cape, 1960)
- David Scott Daniell The Golden Pomegranate (University of London Press, 1960)
- Kenneth Lillington Conjuror's Alibi (Thomas Nelson, 1960)
- Barbara Ireson (ed.) Barnes Book of Nursery Verse (A.S. Barnes, 1960)
- Andrew Sinclair The Breaking of Bumbo (Penguin, 1961)
- Jacynth Hope-Simpson The Bishop of Kenelminster (Putnam, 1961)
- Austin Stevens The Moon Turns Green (Jonathan Cape, 1961)
- Roy Herbert Rufus Tractor (Brockhampton Press, 1961)
- Roy Herbert Rufus Tractor (Bobbs Merrill, 1961)
- Ted Hughes Meet My Folks! (Faber & Faber, 1961)
- G. P. W. Earle Foundations of English (Ginn, 1961)
- Jacynth Hope-Simpson The Bishop's Picture (Putnam, 1962)
- Irene Byers Silka the Seal (Brockhampton Press, 1962)
- Piet Niemand Jan Domm: a romp (Geoffrey Bles, 1962)
- Clarence Jonk Yami and his Unicycle (Faber & Faber, 1962)
- Barbara Ireson (ed.) Verse that is fun (Faber & Faber, 1962)
- Willis Hall The Royal Astrologer: adventures of Father Mole-Cricket of the Malayan legends (Coward, McCann, 1962)
- Elsie Hall Grassam, C.C. Falconer et al. Old Lob Readers (Ginn, 1962–5)
- L. H. Evers Danny's Wonderful Uncle (Thomas Nelson, 1963)
- Alan Garner The Moon of Gomrath (Collins, 1963)
- Alan Garner The Weirdstone of Brisingamen (Puffin, 1963)
- Ted Hughes How the Whale Became (Faber & Faber, 1963)
- Kenneth Methold Vital English (University of London Press, 1963)
- Roy Herbert Rufus rolls on (Brockhampton Press, 1964)
- C. P. Watson (ed.) Fabulae Aesopi: a Latin reader for beginners (Faber & Faber, 1965)
- Margaret Lovett Sir Halmanac and the Crimson Star (Faber & Faber, 1965)
- Boswell Taylor The Running Dog (University of London Press, 1965)
- Margery Fisher (ed.) Open the Door: an anthology of stories (University of London Press, 1965)
- Alan Garner The Moon of Gomrath (Puffin, 1965?)
- Hughes (poems) and Gordon Crosse (music) Meet my Folks! A theme and relations. For speaker, children's chorus, children's percussion band, and adult percussion and instrumental players (Opus 10) (Oxford University Press, 1965)
- George Adamson Widdecombe Fair (Faber & Faber, 1966)
- T. H. White The Sword in the Stone (Collins, 1966)
- Norman Hunter Professor Branestawm's Treasure Hunt (Bodley Head, 1966)
- Norman Hunter Professor Branestawm's Treasure Hunt (Puffin, 1966)
- Ted Hughes The Iron Man: A story in five nights (Faber & Faber, 1968)
- Alison Farthing The Queen's Flowerpot (Oliver & Boyd, 1968)
- Mary Cockett Tufty (Macmillan, 1968). In the Nippers series.
- Geraldine Kaye Bonfire Night (Macmillan, 1968). In the Nippers series.
- Pandora Pollen Henry and Henrietta (Chatto, Boyd and Oliver, 1969)
- George Barker Runes and Rhymes, Tunes and Chimes (Faber & Faber, 1969)
- Kaye Webb & Joan Aitken The Friday Miracle & Other Stories (Puffin 1969, contrib.)
- M. C. V. Jeffreys World To-day: You and Other People (Ginn, 1969)
- Charles Geoffrey Stuttard World To-day: Problems at Work (Ginn, 1969)
- Norman Hunter The Peculiar Triumph of Professor Branestawm (Bodley Head, 1970)
- Norman Hunter The Peculiar Triumph of Professor Branestawm (Puffin Books, 1970)
- J. L. Carr The Red Windcheater (Macmillan, 1970). In the Nippers series.
- Richard Carpenter Catweazle (Methuen, cloth; Puffin, paperback, 1970)
- George Barker To Aylsham Fair (Faber & Faber, 1970)
- Norman Hunter Professor Branestawm's Treasure Hunt (Bodley Head, 1970)
- Margaret Stuart Barry Boffy and the Teacher-eater (Harrap, 1971)
- Richard Parker Me and My Boots (Macmillan, 1971). In the Nippers series.
- Ted Hughes The Iron Man: A story in five nights (Faber & Faber, paperback, 1971)
- Richard Carpenter Catweazle and the Magic Zodiac (Methuen, cloth; Puffin, paperback, 1971)
- Elwyn Thomas Ashton World To-day: People and Leisure (Ginn, 1971)
- Ted Hughes How the Whale Became (Puffin, 1971)
- Norman Hunter Professor Branestawm up the Pole (Bodley Head, 1972)
- Norman Hunter The Peculiar Triumph of Professor Branestawm (Puffin, 1972)
- Trevor Griffiths Tip's Lot (Macmillan, 1972). In the Nippers series.
- Geoffrey Jackson The Oven-Bird and Some Others (Faber & Faber, 1972)
- Mary Cockett An Armful of Sparrows (Macmillan, 1973). In the Nippers series.
- Norman Hunter Professor Branestawm's Dictionary (Puffin, 1974)
- Peter Dickinson Emma Tupper's Diary (Puffin, 1973)
- William Mayne A Game of Dark (Puffin, 1973/4)
- Boswell Taylor The Door that Would Not Open (University of London Press, 1974)
- Margaret Stuart Barry Boffy and the Mumford Ghosts (Harrap, 1974)
- Roger Lancelyn-Green (ed.) Strange Adventures in Time (J.M. Dent & Sons Ltd & E. P. Dutton & Co., Inc., 1974)
- Norman Hunter A Box of Branestawms Puffin gift box (illus. George Adamson) containing The Incredible Adventures of Professor Branestawm (illus. W. Heath Robinson); Professor Branestawm's Treasure Hunt (illus. George Adamson); Peculiar Triumph of Professor Branestawm (illus. George Adamson); Professor Branestawm's Dictionary (cover by George Adamson) 1975
- Norman Hunter Professor Branestawm up the Pole (Puffin, 1975)
- Kaye Webb & Treld Bicknell (eds.) Puffin's Pleasure (Puffin hard covers featuring "The Hiders of King's House": short story with colour illustrations, pp. 23–26 1976)
- Norman Hunter Professor Branestawm's Great Revolution (Puffin, 1977)
- L. H. Evers Danny's Wonderful Uncle (Thomas Nelson, Melbourne, 1977?)
- Ted Hughes Meet My Folks! (Puffin, incl. 4 new illustrations for 4 new poems, 1977)
- Frank Waters The Day the Village Blushed (Harrap, 1977)
- Richard Ingrams and John Wells Dear Bill: The collected letters of Denis Thatcher (Private Eye/Andre Deutsch, 1980)
- Stewart Love Great Marco Scandal (Harrap, 1980)
- Benjamin Winterborn Changing Scenes (Oxford University Press, 1980)
- Norman Hunter The Best of Branestawm (Bodley Head, 8 illustrations along with drawings by W. Heath Robinson, Jill McDonald and Derek Cousins, 1980)
- Richard Ingrams and John Wells The Other Half: Further letters of Denis Thatcher (Private Eye/André Deutsch, 1981)
- Richard Ingrams and John Wells One for the Road (Private Eye/André Deutsch, 1982)
- Richard Ingrams and John Wells My Round (Private Eye/André Deutsch, 1983)
- P. G. Wodehouse, selected with an introduction by Christopher Falkus Short Stories (The Folio Society, 1983)
- Barbara Ireson (ed.) Faber Book of Nursery Verse (Faber & Faber, illustrations inside only; cover design by Pentagram with illustration by Dan Fern, 1983)
- Richard Ingrams and John Wells Bottoms Up! (Private Eye/André Deutsch, 1984)
- Ted Hughes Meet My Folks! (Faber & Faber, incl. 4 Puffin edition illustrations and 1 new one for new poem, 1987)
- Ted Hughes How the Whale Became (Faber & Faber, new cover, 1989)
- Mark Bryant (ed.) Airborne Free: Red Devils and Other Rare Breeds (Leo Cooper, cartoon contribution, 1990)
- Mark Bryant (ed.) It's a Dog's Life: A Canine Cartoon Collection (Robson Books Ltd, cartoon contributions, 1991)
- Ted Hughes Meet My Folks! (Faber & Faber, paperback edition, new cover, Pentagram, 1993)
- Ted Hughes How the Whale Became (Faber & Faber, new cover, 1993)
- Norman Hunter The Peculiar Triumph of Professor Branestawm (Random House, new paperback edition, 2003)
- Ted Hughes The Dreamfighter and Other Creation Tales (Faber & Faber, incl. a reprinting, with Adamson's drawings, of the stories in How the Whale Became, 2003)
- Ted Hughes Meet My Folks! (Faber & Faber, cover by Catherine Rayner, drawings by George Adamson, 2011)
- Ted Hughes How the Whale Became (Faber & Faber, cover by Catherine Rayner, drawings by George Adamson, 2011)
- Norman Hunter The Peculiar Triumph of Professor Branestawm (Penguin Red Fox, 2012, new edition and ebook)

=== Record sleeves and CD covers ===
- Gordon Crosse (music); Ted Hughes (poems) Meet My Folks! A theme and relations. For speaker, children's chorus, children's percussion band, and adult percussion and instrumental players (Opus 10) (EMI, 1965)
- William Alwyn: Fantasy - Waltzes, 12 Preludes John Ogdon, piano (Chandos, record and CD, 1985)

== Selected exhibitions ==
- Walker Art Gallery, Liverpool, 1933, 1935, 1936, 1937
- Atkinson Gallery, Southport, 1934
- Liverpool Etchers' & Engravers' Exhibition, 1938
- Royal Academy, 1937, 1939, 1940, 1948
- Kenn Group Exhibition, Exeter School of Art, September 1947
- Royal Albert Memorial Museum and Art Gallery: "Exhibition of Drawings, Paintings, Sculpture and Craft: Work by members of the Exeter School of Art Staff", 27 June to 29 July 1950
- SIAD Exhibition Illustration Group, 1957
- Arts Council: "Book Illustration", 1958
- American Institute of Graphic Arts: "British Illustration", 1959
- "Covering Punch", 1960, toured Britain, 1961
- University of Exeter, Devonshire House, drawings, 1962
- Wilhelm Busch Museum [Deutsches Museum für Karikatur und Zeichenkunst Wilhelm Busch], Hanover: Punch drawings, 1963, toured Germany 1964
- Drawings from BBC Publications, 1963
- East Kent Folkestone Arts Centre: "Cartoonists of the British School", 1968
- Royal Albert Memorial Museum, Exeter: "Adamson Exhibition", a one-man show, 1968
- Galerie Genot, Paris: "L'Humour Actuel franco-britannique. 200 dessins" [Franco-British Humour Today: 200 drawings], 20 November 1974 to 10 December 1974, but extended
- Ilkley Literature Festival: An exhibition in honour of Ted Hughes, devised and presented by Keith Sagar to mark the poet's involvement in the Ilkley Literature Festival, May 27–31, 1975 (Church House, Church Street, Ilkley)
- The London Gallery, N. La Cienega, Los Angeles: "Famous British Cartoonists", 19 May to 15 June 1975
- Market Print Gallery, Exeter: "George Adamson Cartoons Christmas Show", 1976?
- The University of Liverpool, Senate House, Abercromby Square: "Contemporary British Artists: an exhibition of work donated to the Rural Preservation Association", 1977
- Market Print Gallery, Exeter: "Etchings", 30 September to 31 October 1978
- SouthEast Art Centres, "Fantasy Books and Illustrations", 1979
- Ilkley Literature Festival: "Lord Gnome Show", 1979
- The Library, Victoria & Albert Museum: "Illustrations to Ted Hughes Poems", 1979. Exhibition organized by Mark Haworth-Booth, Assistant Keeper of Photographs, Department of Prints, Drawings and Photographs
- City Art Gallery, Mosley Street, Manchester: "The Art of Ted Hughes: An exhibition to mark the poet's fiftieth birthday, devised and presented by Keith Sagar", 12 August to 7 September 1980
- The Royal Society of Painter-Etchers and Engravers, 17 January to 12 February 1981
- The Royal Society of Painter-Etchers and Engravers, 8 to 28 June 1981
- The Royal Society of Painter-Etchers and Engravers, 20 March to 10 April 1982 (Centenary Exhibition)
- Hamilton Gallery, London: "Eye Art at Hamilton's, drawings from the Denis Thatcher letters books", 1982
- Maison du Champ de Mars, Rennes: "Exposition des artistes d'Exeter", 1982: etchings exhibited: Filming The Onedin Line, Peacocks, St Andrews Cathedral, Caerphilly Castle
- The Royal Society of Painter-Etchers and Engravers, 30 October to 26 November 1982
- The Royal Society of Painter-Etchers and Engravers, 26 October to 27 November 1983
- The Royal Society of Painter-Etchers and Engravers, 18 September to 11 October 1987
- The Royal Festival Hall, London: "Punch 150th Anniversary Exhibition", 11 October to 17 November 1991
- National Portrait Gallery: "Eyetimes: 35 years of Private Eye", 1996
- British Library: "The Page is Printed: a Ted Hughes exhibition," 7 November 2003 to 24 February 2004
- McLean Museum, Greenock, Inverclyde's War: an exhibition to mark the 60th anniversary of the end of hostilities, August 2005: reproduction of several of Adamson's wartime drawings of RAF Greenock
- Cartoon Museum, London: "Private Eye at 45": an exhibition to mark the 45th anniversary of the founding of Private Eye, 26 October 2006 to 4 February 2007: featuring two of Adamson's drawings illustrating "Auberon Waugh's Diary" and an unpublished drawing to mark Private Eye's 21st birthday in 1983
- Victoria and Albert Museum, London: "Private Eye: The First 50 Years", 18 October 2011 to 8 January 2012: featuring Adamson's cover drawing for One for the Road
- Victoria and Albert Museum, London: "George W. Adamson: A Twentieth-Century Illustrator", 3 April to 30 September 2012
- British Library (Folio Society Gallery), London: "Picture This: Children's Illustrated Classics", 4 October 2013 to 26 January 2014: featuring Adamson's cover design for The Iron Man by Ted Hughes

== Awards and honours ==
Adamson was the winner of the P.G. Wodehouse Centenary Illustration Award in Punch in 1981 and was subsequently commissioned to illustrate an anthology of P.G. Wodehouse short stories for the Folio Society published in 1983.

George Adamson was elected a fellow of the Royal Society of Painter-Printmakers in 1987.

== Bibliography ==
- Adamson, George (contributor) (1984), 'Eleven Printmakers: Approaches, Opinions, Experiences', The Journal of the Royal Society of Painter-Etchers & Engravers, no. 6, 1984, pp. 18–19
- Connolly, Joseph, Eighty Years of Book Cover Design, Faber & Faber, London, 2009 ISBN 978-0571-24000-5
- Desmet, Anne, and Anthony Dyson, Printmakers: The Directory, A & C Black, London, 2006, p. 3 ISBN 978-0-7136-7387-6
- Faber & Faber,100 Faber Postcards, Faber & Faber, 2015 ISBN 978-0571-32024-0
- Walasek, Helen (ed.), foreword by Quentin Blake, The Best of Punch Cartoons in Colour, Prion, 2012 ISBN 978-1-85375-856-0
