= Professor Branestawm =

Children's book series

The Incredible Adventures of Professor Branestawm, the first book in the series, shown here in its Puffin paperback edition with cover drawing by W. Heath Robinson

Professor Branestawm is a series of thirteen children's books written by the English author Norman Hunter. Professor Theophilus Branestawm is depicted throughout the books as the archetypal absent-minded professor and his name is a variant of the word "brainstorm". The first two books in the series were first published in the 1930s, but the other 11 appeared much later, from 1970 onwards.

== Characters ==
Professor Branestawm is always at work in his "Inventory" creating bizarre inventions, all of which either malfunction or work in unanticipated ways, and which lead him into incredible adventures, often accompanied by his friend Colonel Dedshott of the Catapult Cavaliers (soldiers who use catapults as their only weapon), and his housekeeper Mrs. Flittersnoop. He lives in Great Pagwell, which is apparently surrounded by other Pagwells (Little Pagwell, Pagwell Heights, Pagwell Gardens, Lower Pagwell, Upper Pagwell, Pagwell Green, Pagwell Centre, Pagwell Market, Pagwell Docks etc.). In "The Professor Borrows a Book", he manages to lose fourteen different copies of the same book from fourteen different public libraries, and has to cycle frantically between fourteen different Pagwells to renew his books to avoid being fined. In "The Fair at Pagwell Green", the Professor is mistaken for a waxwork, only because of Colonel Dedshott. The Colonel thought the waxwork to be a frozen professor, so he and Mrs. Flittersnoop heated it, melting the waxwork. Meanwhile, the Professor was covered along with all the waxworks when he was lost in thought. He suddenly stopped thinking and when trying to get out of the fair, was thought to be a living waxwork.

The Professor is described in the first book as having, like all great men, simple tastes: "His coat was simply fastened with safety pins because the buttons had simply fallen off. His head was simply bald and it simply shone like anything when the sun caught it." He has five pairs of spectacles – one for reading, one for writing, one for out of doors, one for looking at you over the top of and a fifth pair for looking for the others on the frequent occasions when they get lost. Other pairs of spectacles are often mentioned.

Mrs. Flittersnoop, his housekeeper, causes trouble a few times through her lack of understanding for the Professor's genius. In "The Wild Waste Paper", she throws what seems to be a bottle of cough medicine into the waste bin. The liquid turns out to be the Professor's elixir of life, which was in the bottle because cough medicine is the only thing that can stop the stuff dead without actually destroying it. Since the bottle was uncorked to allow air in (nothing can live without air), the waste paper in the bin comes to life. Even when stuck up a pear tree surrounded by giant, predatory bits of waste paper, the Professor retains his scientific detachment, wondering if a carpenter's bill would know a saw if it saw one, and if so, whether the gas bill might explode at any moment.

The names of other characters in the books, like the Professor's, are puns:

- Mrs. Flittersnoop – the Professor's housekeeper
- Colonel Dedshott – his best friend
- General Shatterfortz – the Colonel's commanding officer
- Commander Hardaport (Retired) – a neighbour of the Professor's
- Mr. Chintzbitz – a friend of the Colonel's who owns a furniture shop
- Dr. Mumpzanmeasle – the local doctor

== Plot devices ==
Many of the Professor's perils result from simple absent-mindedness. In "The Screaming Clocks", he invents a clock that doesn't need winding up, but the omission of an important component ("I forgot to put a little wiggly thing in") means the clock doesn't stop at twelve but continues striking thirteen, fourteen and so forth until it can't keep up with itself. In "Burglars!", the Professor invents an automatic burglar catcher, but forgets his house key, tries to get in the window and is grabbed and trussed up by his own machine so thoroughly that even Mrs. Flittersnoop fails to recognise him and bashes him over the head for good measure.

Many of the troubles that the professor experiences are the result of his inventions' rebelling and showing anthropomorphic personalities. For instance, the phrase "No Branestawm invention was going to stand for that" occurs several times in the series. Branestawm's inventions frequently object to anyone's using them in ways for which they were not designed. For instance, in a story about the Professor's making cuckoo clocks for all his friends, a fight broke out between the clocks, resulting in the destruction of all of them.

== Illustrators ==
Professor Branestawm's Treasure Hunt, the second book in the series, shown here in its 1966 edition with jacket drawing by George Adamson

The first book featuring Professor Branestawm was The Incredible Adventures of Professor Branestawm, first published in 1933 and illustrated by W. Heath Robinson. Heath Robinson was famous for his rickety contraptions, and the illustrations were a perfect foil to the outlandish plots of these short stories, each picture typically featuring the professor's unfeasibly large forehead. The original book contained a section called seventy-six illustrations by W. Heath Robinson, each with evocative titles such as A telescope of his own invention or With nothing on at all but a big smile (referring to a picture of an extra specially young professor).

The sequel was Professor Branestawm's Treasure Hunt, published 1937. The first edition was illustrated by James Arnold, with George Adamson illustrating the 1966 reissue. Adamson went on to illustrate The Peculiar Triumph of Professor Branestawm, Professor Branestawm up the Pole and the Puffin edition of Professor Branestawm's Great Revolution, as well as a Branestawm story in the Puffin Annual and two in Puffin Post. The Peculiar Triumph of Professor Branestawm with Adamson's illustrations was reissued by Red Fox Classics (Random House) in 2003.

Derek Cousins illustrated Professor Branestawm's Compendium of Conundrums, Riddles, Puzzles, Brain Twiddlers and Dotty Descriptions, published in 1975 and 1977. He went on to illustrate Professor Branestawm Round the Bend, published in 1977, and Professor Branestawm's Perilous Pudding, in 1979. New-Zealand-born children's writer and illustrator, Jill McDonald illustrated Professor Branestawm's Do-It-Yourself Handbook, published in 1976 and 1979. Her illustrations also appeared in The Best of Branestawm, with George Adamson, Derek Cousins, and W. Heath Robinson.

In the 1980s Gerald Rose illustrated Professor Branestawm books in the Young Puffin Read Alone series. These titles were Professor Branestawm and the Wild Letters, and Professor Branestawm's Pocket Motor Car, published by The Bodley Head in 1981. He also illustrated the combined edition of Professor Branestawm's Pocket Motor Car & Professor Branestawm And the Wild Letters, published in 1982. Professor Branestawm's Mouse War, The Bodley Head, published in 1982 and 1984, and Professor Branestawm's Building Bust-Up, published in 1982), were also illustrated by him. Professor Branestawm's Crunchy Crockery, a combined edition of Professor Branestawm's Crunchy Crockery And Professor Branestawm's Hair-Raising Idea was published in 1983 and 1994 and illustrated by Gerald Rose.

== Books in the series ==
(Complete):

- The Incredible Adventures of Professor Branestawm, John Lane, The Bodley Head (1933), first appeared in The Merry-Go-Round (April to October 1929 - 5 issues), Basil Blackwell (1929); Penguin Books, Puffin Books (1946; 1969; 1973); The Bodley Head (1965; 1988); Penguin Red Fox (2008; 2011); Penguin Random House, Vintage Children's Classics (2013), illustrated by W. Heath Robinson
- Professor Branestawm's Treasure Hunt, John Lane, The Bodley Head (1937); Puffin Books (1966), illustrated by George Adamson
- The Peculiar Triumph of Professor Branestawm, The Bodley Head (1970); Puffin Books (1970); Penguin Red Fox (2012), illustrated by George Adamson
- Professor Branestawm Up the Pole, The Bodley Head (1972); Puffin Books (1972), illustrated by George Adamson
- Professor Branestawm's Dictionary, The Bodley Head (1973; 1974), illustrated by Derek Cousins,
- Professor Branestawm's Dictionary, Puffin Books (1974), illustrated by Derek Cousins, with cover by George Adamson
- Professor Branestawm's Great Revolution, The Bodley Head (1974), illustrated by David Hughes; Puffin (1977), illustrated by George Adamson
- Professor Branestawm's Compendium of Conundrums, Riddles, Puzzles, Brain Twiddlers and Dotty Descriptions, The Bodley Head (1975); Puffin Books (1977), illustrated by Derek Cousins
- Professor Branestawm's Do-It-Yourself Handbook, The Bodley Head (1976); Puffin (1979), illustrated by Jill McDonald
- Professor Branestawm Round the Bend, The Bodley Head (1977); Puffin Books (1980), illustrated by Derek Cousins
- Professor Branestawm's Perilous Pudding, The Bodley Head (1979); Puffin Books (1983), illustrated by Derek Cousins
- The Best of Branestawm, The Bodley Head (1980), illustrated by George Adamson, Derek Cousins, W. Heath Robinson and Jill McDonald
- Professor Branestawm and the Wild Letters, The Bodley Head (1981), illustrated by Gerald Rose
- Professor Branestawm's Pocket Motor Car, The Bodley Head (1981), combined edition of Professor Branestawm's Pocket Motor Car & Professor Branestawm And the Wild Letters, Penguin Random House / Puffin Books (1982), illustrated by Gerald Rose
- Professor Branestawm's Mouse War, The Bodley Head (1982); Penguin (Young Puffin Books) (1984), illustrated by Gerald Rose
- Professor Branestawm's Building Bust-Up, The Bodley Head (1982), illustrated by Gerald Rose
- Professor Branestawm's Crunchy Crockery, The Bodley Head (1983) combined edition of Professor Branestawm's Crunchy Crockery And Professor Branestawm's HairRaising Idea (Young Puffin Read Alone Series), Puffin Books (1994), illustrated by Gerald Rose
- Professor Branestawm's Hair-Raising Idea, The Bodley Head (1983), illustrated by Gerald Rose
- Professor Branestawm Stories, Penguin Red Fox (2000; 2017), illustrated by W. Heath Robinson and others

The following books by Norman Hunter appear in the British Library catalogue.

- Professor Branestawm's Dictionary (with cover by George Adamson, Puffin, 1973).
- Professor Branestawm’s Compendium of Conundrums, Riddles, Puzzles, Brain Twiddlers and Dotty Descriptions (1975)
- Professor Branestawm’s Do-it-yourself Handbook (1976, illustrated by Jill McDonald)
- Professor Branestawm Stories (2000, c1980)
- The Best of Branestawm (with illustrations by George Adamson, Derek Cousins, W. Heath Robinson and Jill McDonald, Bodley Head, 1980)

== Translations ==
Professor Branestawm books have been translated into several languages, among them French, German, Italian, Polish, Slovenian, Swedish, Thai, and Persian.

- Le professeur Brindesong; Nouvelles aventures de Brindesong; Brindesong et ses crêpes mécaniques, transl. François Paliard of The Incredible Adventures of Professor Branestawm, illustrated by W. Heath Robinson. Paris: Je lis avec plaisir no. 3, 3 vols., OCDL [Office central de librairie], 1974 ISBN 978-2-7043-3029-4
- Professor Hirnschlags unglaubliche Abenteuer, transl. Wolf Harranth, illustrated by W. Heath Robinson, Vienna and Munich: Verlag Jungbrunnen, 1971 ISBN 978-3-442-20094-8
- Die geheime Geheim-Maschine. Professor Hirnschlags verrückte Abenteuer, Vienna: Jugend u. Volk, 1992 ISBN 978-3-7026-5340-8
- Professor Capoturbine, transl. Mariarosa Zannini, illustrated by W. Heath Robinson, colour illustrations by Leo Mattioli, Florence: Vallecchi, 1961
- Lo strano trionfo del professor Capoturbine, transl. Laura Draghi, illustrated by George Adamson. Florence: Vallecchi, 1973 ISBN 978-88-252-4605-6
- Wynalazki profesora Wymyślika, transl. Henryk Krzeczkowski of Professor Branestawm up the Pole, illustrated by Andrzej Barecki. Warsaw: Krajowa Agencja Wydawnicza RSW "Prasa-Książka-Ruch", 1976
- Profesor Modrinjak, transl. by Janez Gradišnik. Ljubljana: Mladinska Knjiga, 1976
- Professor Snillekvists underbara äventyr, transl. Britt G. Hallqvist of The Incredible Adventures of Professor Branestawm, illustrated by W. Heath Robinson. Stockholm: Natur & Kultur, 1957

== Adaptations ==
Later Ace of Wands writer Trevor Preston adapted the first two books into a seven-episode television sitcom for Thames Television starring Jack Woolgar as Branestawm, entitled The Incredible Adventures of Professor Branestawm, broadcast from 10 July to 28 August 1969. Episodes were directed by Pamela Lonsdale (nos. 1–5) and Voytek (nos. 6–7).

In 2001 five stories were adapted for BBC Radio 4, with the Professor voiced by John Fortune.

In 2014, a BBC hour-long television film adaptation of Hunter's books, written by Charlie Higson and starring Harry Hill as Professor Branestawm, was broadcast on Christmas Eve. Filming for this took place in Shere, Surrey in early October 2014, then Wallingford in mid October, and included David Mitchell, Simon Day, Ben Miller and Miranda Richardson. In 2015, a sequel, also an hour-long, entitled Professor Branestawm Returns aired on Christmas Eve at 5.20pm on BBC One.
