= John Verney =

John Verney may refer to:

- John Verney, 1st Viscount Fermanagh (1640–1717), Irish peer, English MP for Buckinghamshire and Amersham
- John Verney (politician) (c. 1652–1707), English MP for Leicestershire (UK Parliament constituency)
- John Verney (judge) (1699–1741), British Master of the Rolls, MP for Downton
- John Verney, 20th Baron Willoughby de Broke (1896–1986), British officer, Lord Lieutenant of Warwickshire
- John Verney (author) (1913-1993), British author and illustrator
