= Rome Done Lightly =

1972 book by George Worsley Adamson

- Jacket showing the Capitoline sculpture of Romulus and Remus and the she-wolf
- Author: George Adamson
- Illustrator: George Adamson
- Cover artist: George Adamson
- Language: English
- Release number: 1st edition
- Subject: Humour, Rome, Tourism
- Published: London
- Publisher: Chatto & Windus
- Publication date: 13 January 1972
- Publication place: United Kingdom
- Media type: Print
- Pages: 45
- ISBN: 978-0-7011-1622-4
- OCLC: 548618
- Dewey Decimal: 914.56/32/0492
- LC Class: DG806.2 .A63
- Website: www.georgewadamson.com

Rome Done Lightly is George Adamson's 1972 "light-hearted romp" in words and drawings through the Eternal City.

== Summary ==
"Tongue in cheek, [Adamson] sets the reader on a trail of research — does the Church of San Demente really exist? Why was the Bridge of Four Heads so named?" His text is full of curious and useful information, and some of the drawings were first published in Punch in two cartoon features on Rome.

== Critical reception ==
The Economist praised the artist's skill as a cartoonist: "Familiarity breeds caricature: it is difficult to cartoon the unfamiliar. Mr Adamson has managed beautifully, with the minimum of tedious explanation and the maximum of careful drawing . . ." Cecil Roberts writing in Books and Bookmen touched upon a paradox underlying much of Adamson's work: "I wish [Rome] wasn't done so lightly. I am distressed to see so superb an artist put on cap and bells when illustrating the Roman scene."
