= The Young Elizabethan =

British children's literary magazine

Young Elizabethan
- Young Elizabethan, January 1955
- Categories: Children's literary magazine
- Frequency: Monthly
- Founder: William Collins
- First issue: January 1948
- Final issue: 1973
- Country: United Kingdom
- Based in: London
- Language: English
- ISSN: 0013-6255

Young Elizabethan was a British children's literary magazine of the 20th century. Advertised as "the magazine to grow up with", it was a publication for ten to sixteen year-olds, particularly targeting grammar school students.

== History and profile ==
For children in the 1940s access to books was limited to home or public libraries where available. A magazine is an ideal book of samples for all readers where they can explore their interests and start a journey towards books and information. Previous children's literary periodicals, such as St. Nicholas, Little Folks (United States) and Little Folks (Great Britain), showed that there was a market for a good magazine for boys and girls, but these had all ceased publication. During the 1940s, in both Britain and the United States, there was an increase in the number of comics for younger children and adult periodicals, but nothing for children aged ten to fourteen. In 1944 Noel Streatfeild suggested the first ideas for a magazine to fill the gap.

The idea of a new children's magazine was developed by William Collins (known as Billy) of Collins publishers and Pamela Whitlock, the children's editor of the Collins children's list. A small committee was formed that decided the magazine should be monthly and should contain the work of the best writers and artists for children. No particular class, age or sex would be targeted and the articles would aim to stretch the reader's understanding. After some experimentation a guide for material in each issue was set; one installment of a serial, two short stories, some verse, two articles one for boys and one for girls but preferably both, making and doing articles, a photographic feature, a book article, and a prize competition. Letters from children would be encouraged to help steer the direction of the magazine without giving them everything they wanted. It was felt that for the target audience everything is readable and everything is possible. The magazine would not imitate St. Nicholas but would be close in spirit.

William Collins faced multiple challenges to be able to found a new children's magazine in Britain in the late 1940s. No new periodical was allowed to start due to post-war regulations required to ration paper, so production was moved to Canada. The magazine was edited, proofed and corrected in London. Then the printer created a thin metal stereo which was sent to Toronto. There they were used to print the magazine which was then shipped back to Britain. However, due to a wartime regulation still in force, no magazine printed overseas could be imported into Britain and sold on bookstalls. But it could be sent in the post, so the magazine had to be purchased by a direct yearly subscription. This meant no one could see a copy of the magazine until they ordered twelve, so they bought on faith. Production in Britain finally became possible in 1950.

=== Collins Magazine (January 1948 – March 1953) ===
The first issue of the new magazine was published in January 1948 as Collins Magazine for Boys and Girls. Pamela Whitlock was editor and Roger Smithells was art editor. Adverts at the time announced that it would include stories, articles and illustrations by leading authors and artists of the day. These included Norman Collins, Eleanor Farjeon, Noel Streatfeild, J. M. Scott, Viola Garvin and Ursula Leacock. It cost 1/6 for each monthly magazine (equivalent to £3 in 2025) which made it more affordable to upper and middle-class families. As a consequence, the stories and articles in the early editions reflected this demographic. Other articles covered nature, expeditions, handicraft and sport. There were also puzzles, competitions and a regular feature of book reviews.

During the first few years the magazine changed name multiple times; Collins Magazine for Boys and Girls (January 1948 – June 1949 and April 1950 – November 1951), Collins for Boys and Girls (July 1949 – March 1950), Collins Magazine (December 1951 – March 1953). However, from the first edition John Verney had produced the illustration for the cover which set the visual style for the magazine. Then, on the July 1951 edition, readers were shocked by a plain blue and yellow background with typographical design. Inside readers were told that Verney, who had been producing the covers for over three years, had asked to take a break to focus on other work. One reader wrote in to comment that it looked like an advert for disinfectant. Photographs were used on the cover for the first time in the subsequent issues until December when Verney's illustrations were seen again.

=== Young Elizabethan (April 1953 – March 1958) ===
In April 1953, two months before the coronation of Elizabeth II, the magazine changed its name to Collins Young Elizabethan to honour the new queen. The Young Elizabethan Club was started the same year. By this time the magazine had become a flagship for the growing number of children's publishers in the 1950s.

In 1954 the magazine was sold to Periodical Publications Ltd owned by John Grigg, who already edited the National and English Review. The editor, Laura Fergusson, suggested to him that Kaye Webb take over from September 1954.

In January 1955, with Kaye Webb as the new editor, the magazine changed its name to Young Elizabethan. The cover design became the distinctive solid block of colour with an illustration in an asymmetric oval. It still retained its original content template of serialised novels, short stories, book reviews, poems, puzzles, and drawings. A new character, Nigel Molesworth, first appeared in this issue and continued to appear regularly until December 1958. At this time there were five members of staff putting the magazine together each month; Webb (Editor), Jenny Day (Assistant Editor), Anne Hawkins (Club Secretary and Sub Editor), Patricia Campbell (Editorial Secretary) and Bill Burnard (Art Work). John Verney continued to provide all the cover illustrations until May 1956 when the task was shared with a succession of different artists including Ronald Searle (husband of Kaye Webb) and Edward Ardizzone.

An Emergency Number of the magazine was produced late for April 1956. It was thinner and smaller than usual due to a printers strike in the spring of that year. In her editors letter, Webb said she chose to give the readers something for the Easter holidays rather than wait for things to return to normal.

In 1957 Webb established the Young Elizabethan Poetry Award. In the first year the Arts Council of Great Britain provided a Poetry Panel to review and judge poetry that had been submitted to the magazine since 1955. The judges were Christopher Fry and Patric Dickinson. Another prize that year for four female readers was an appearance as extras in the film Blue Murder at St Trinian's based on the work of Ronald Searle and staring Joyce Grenfell, both Y.E. Club patrons.

=== Elizabethan (April 1958 – 1973) ===
In April 1958 the title was changed again to Elizabethan.

In its final years it became a teenage magazine and it was separated from Collins. It ceased publication in 1973.

== Editors ==
- Pamela Whitlock was the first editor in 1948. She had spent the war in the Women's Royal Air Force before joining Collins and edited the children's list until 1953, when she was succeeded by Robin Denniston.
- Laura Fergusson (c.1952 – 1954) was the editor when the magazine was sold to Periodical Publications Ltd. She was the wife of Brigadier Bernard Fergusson and sister-in-law to Joyce Grenfell, one of the Young Elizabethan Club patrons.
- Kaye Webb (January 1955 – January 1958)
- Patricia Campbell (February 1958 – after January 1964) was editorial secretary and later assistant editor to Kaye Webb before becoming editor. She was also the wife of magazine owner John Grigg.
- Tom Pocock (February 1958 – after November 1959) was a war correspondent who had published articles in Young Elizabethan under the name Guy Allcot.
- John Verney, 1961–1962
- Lewis Sheringham, was editor in 1968

== Contributors ==
The magazine published works from established authors, illustrators, photographs and more. For information about contributors and works published see Category:Works originally published in The Young Elizabethan.

== Collins Magazine Annual ==
Whilst the magazine was owned by Collins, readers could purchase red cloth binding cases which held twelve issues each. They could be used to hold magazines loose or be used as the cover for magazines bound in book form. Collins also published the Collins Magazine Annual which was a compilation of works chosen from the magazine and was printed in eight volumes from 1948 to 1955. Although the magazine changed names several times during this period the annual title remained the same. The annual stopped being produced when the magazine was taken over by Periodical Publications Ltd.

- Volume one (1948) contains content from the first six months of the magazine (January 1948 to June 1948)
- Volume two (1949) contains content that appeared in the magazine from July 1948 to March 1949
- Volume three (1950) contains content that appeared in the magazine from April 1949 to December 1949

== Young Elizabethan Club ==
In 1953 a club was formed associated with the magazine which had recently changed to Collins Young Elizabethan. The club was called the Young Elizabethan Club, often referred to as Y.E. Club. The purpose was to "link Young Elizabethans all over the world and encourage them in a sense of adventure: to help them in their choice of reading matter and to recognise quality in every aspect of their lives: to provide opportunities for self-expression not only by publishing articles and illustrations but by providing advice and information on all subjects." A proportion of the competitions in the magazine where members only and the club had parties and outings organised during the year. The Music Group performed concerts conducted by Rita Sharpe and the Naturalists had outings to Peter Scott's Wildfowl Collection at Peakirk under the guidance of R.S.R. Fitter. The 3rd Club Party in December 1955 was attendend by approximately 400 guests and partially broadcast on Flickwiz television. The club still existed in association with Elizabethan in January 1964.

The club originally had four vice-presidents; Lord Rowallan, Pat Smythe, Sir John Hunt and Neville Duke. This role later changed to patron and other notable people joined including Svetlana Beriosova, Benjamin Britten, Lord David Cecil, Joyce Grenfell, Dr Julian Huxley, Ronald Searle, Noel Streatfeild and Cecil Woodham-Smith.

== Black Marigolds by Gillian Bell ==
In the July 1951 edition a new competition was announced inviting readers to submit a manuscript suitable for publication as a book. No specific number of words was required and both long and short manuscripts would be considered. The first prize was an agreement to publish the book within twelve months of the competition closing date on the usual terms made with new writers, including an advance payment of £50 (equivalent to £1,366 in 2025). The judges had the right to withhold the first prize if they felt that no manuscript was up to the standard required for publication. Awards for runners up would include fountain pens, theatre tickets, cameras, books and free subscriptions to the magazine for 1952. The closing date was December of that year.

The result was published in the magazine in September 1952 with an apology from the editor, Laura Fergusson, for how long it had taken. There had been over 200 entries ranging from 500 to 93,000 words. The judges had been Noel Streatfeild, Laura Fergusson and Pamela Whitlock the magazine's first editor, who had herself been a young author when first published. Most of the entries were pale imitation of books of the time. School stories and fantasies were popular. Girl writers gave more importance to the appearance of characters, whilst boy writers describe the action with occasional description of the characters looks. The judges selected sixteen entries for special commendation which included The Other Visitors by David Rudkin then aged fifteen. But there had been no doubt about the winner; Black Marigolds by Gillian Bell who was sixteen when she wrote it. The judges had been surprised by the skill and sophistication of the work and at first they felt that Gillian was not the actual author. Gillian was invited to London to be interviewed by Furgusson and Streatfeild to verify that it was all her own work.

The story featured seven children: Brixham, Cynara, Jasmine, Rose, Samela, Ermine and Imelda. They live near a cathedral and have strict parents and a tyrannical nanny. Inspired by the evil gargoyles on the cathedral they decide to blow up the family home and escape to a new life. The story was serialised in six parts in Collins Young Elizabethan from May 1953 to October 1953 with illustrations by John Verney. By this time it had become a story within a story, dreamed by a girl called Mary Edwards who was lying in a coma after a cycling accident.

The book was published by Collins in October 1953 with the first half of the book given to the story of Mary Edwards and the second half the story that had been serialised in the magazine. New images by John Verney were included but many that had appeared in the magazine were not. Collins, obliged to publish the book, had felt that the original story was too short and Gillian Bell had been asked to write more. Unable to expand the original story she had created a new one, but had to work at the same time as she was studying for A-levels. Collins may also have been nervous about a story where children blow up their parents and the public response to this theme. Black Marigolds was enthusiastically received by readers and critics of the day. But despite the "freshness, originality and sheer good humour" of the work and the promise of another book, Gillian Bell never wrote for children again.
