= James Arnold (commercial artist) =

British artist (1909–1999)

James Arnold (2 July 1909 – 7 September 1999) was an English commercial artist who developed a passion for the wagons that he saw on his cycling tours of the countryside in the pre- and post-War years. He set about producing painstakingly accurate measured drawings and watercolours of all the main regional types that he came across and these he included in a series of books beginning with The Joyous Wheel (1940) and including The Farm Waggons of England and Wales (1969).

== Life ==
Arnold was born in Southall, Middlesex on 2 July 1909.

Never owning a car, he cycled all his life, claiming to have covered nearly half a million miles in his lifetime. He often toured with fellow members of the Cyclists' Touring Club (CTC).

James Arnold died in Welland, Worcestershire, on 7 September 1999.

== Publications ==
- The Joyous Wheel, Hamish Hamilton, 1940
- The Countryman’s Workshop, Phoenix House, 1953
- The Shell Book of Country Crafts, John Baker, 1968
- The Farm Waggons of England and Wales, John Baker, 1969
- All Made by Hand, John Baker, 1970
- Farm Waggons and Carts, David & Charles, 1977
- All Drawn by Horses, David & Charles, 1979

As illustrator:

- Hunter, Norman, Professor Branestawm's Treasure Hunt, John Lane, The Bodley Head, 1937 – Arnold's illustrations were used for the first edition only.
- Herring, Maisie. Shropshire, Paul Elek, 1949
- Peel, J. H. B. (John Hugh Brignal), The Chilterns, Paul Elek, 1950
- Edwards, Tudor. Warwickshire, Paul Elek, 1950
