= John Verney (author) =

English artist and writer (1913-1993)

Sir John Verney Bt., MC
- Born: 30 September 1913; Paddington, London UK
- Died: 2 February 1993 (aged 79); Clare, Suffolk, UK
- Burial place: Middle Claydon Cemetery, Middle Claydon, Buckinghamshire, UK
- Education: Eton College
- Alma mater: Christ Church, Oxford
- Spouse: Jan Musgrave (m. 1939)
- Children: 7
- Parents: Ralph Verney (father); Janette Cheveria Hamilton Walker (mother)
- Relatives: Frederick Verney (paternal grandfather); Sir Harry Verney (great-grandfather)
- Military career
- Allegiance: United Kingdom
- Branch: British Army
- Service years: 1939-45
- Rank: Major
- Units: North Somerset Yeomanry; Special Boat Service; Special Air Service; Royal Armoured Corps
- Conflicts: World War II; Invasion of Syria; Western Desert campaign; Operation Hawthorn
- Awards: Military Cross; Mentioned in dispatches Légion d'honneur

Sir John Verney, 2nd Baronet, MC (30 September 1913 – 2 February 1993) was an author, illustrator, painter, and soldier. His best-known work is a memoir of his experiences of the Italian campaigns of the Second World War, Going to the Wars, published in 1955. He also wrote a number of books for children and young adults and was the inventor, compiler and illustrator of the Dodo Pad diary, still produced annually today.

== Early life and education ==
Verney was born in London on 30 September 1913, the son of Ralph Verney, who later went on to become secretary to the Speaker of the House of Commons and was created 1st Baronet Verney, of Eaton Square in 1946, and Janette Cheveria Hamilton (née Walker), an Australian heiress. He spent part of his early childhood in India, where his father was serving as military secretary to the Viceroy, Lord Chelmsford. Educated at Eton College, Verney read History at Christ Church, Oxford, taking a 3rd-class degree, and then spent a year training at the Architectural Association in London. Before the outbreak of war he worked as an assistant director with both Charles Laughton and Robert Donat.

== Military service in the Second World War ==
As a member of the North Somerset Yeomanry, Verney was called up at the outbreak of war in September 1939. Commissioned as a lieutenant, he served initially in Palestine before taking part in the invasion of Syria in 1941 and the Western Desert campaign in 1942. Verney then volunteered for the Special Boat Service (SBS), as a member of which he took part in Operation Hawthorn in July 1943, parachuting into Sardinia to attack and destroy German aircraft stationed on the island. He was captured, but along with two others he escaped from a train and managed to rejoin the Eighth Army after three months hiding out in the Abruzzi mountains. He saw service in France and Germany as a major in the Royal Armoured Corps. He was awarded the Military Cross in 1944, and the Légion d'honneur in 1945.

== Post-war career ==
Whilst still at Eton, Verney had made some drawings in the style of Heath Robinson, some of which he submitted for publication (without success) to Punch. Following his demobilisation in November 1945, he began to paint, in a variety of styles and using a range of media, and exhibited at London galleries such as the Leicester, the Redfern, and the New Grafton. A more reliable source of income was his work writing and illustrating children's magazines and books; he also had a brief period as editor of The Young Elizabethan in 1961–2.

In 1955, he published Going to the Wars, "a vivid account of his years in the army which subtly blended humour and seriousness" (Oxford Dictionary of National Biography); a sequel, A Dinner of Herbs, in which Verney returned to the towns and villages of the Abruzzi mountains where he had been held captive during the war, was published in 1966.

In 1965 he produced the Dodo Pad "a combined memo-doodle-engage-diary-message-ment book" for the year 1966. With a gap in 1972, he produced a Dodo Pad every year until 1992. The Dodo Pad is still produced today and follows the same structure and format he devised to keep track of his large family.

On the death of his father in February 1959, Verney succeeded to the title of the 2nd Baronet Verney, of Eaton Square, City of Westminster. In 1968, he was elected to Farnham urban district council as an independent, and helped found the Farnham Trust, now one of the oldest building preservation trusts in the UK. A number of his paintings depicting local scenes are displayed in the Museum of Farnham. In the early 1980s he served as chairman of the Gainsborough Museum at Sudbury, Suffolk.

== Personal life ==
In 1939 Verney married Lucinda Musgrave (known as Jan). They had seven children – two boys and five girls; their eldest son, Julian, died aged 8 in November 1948. John Verney died aged 79, on 2 February 1993 at his home, the White House, in Clare, Suffolk. He was succeeded in his title by Sir John Sebastian Verney, 3rd Baronet, also an author.

== Bibliography ==
- Verney Abroad (1954)
- Going to the Wars (1955)
- Friday's Tunnel (1959)
- February's Road (1961)
- Every Advantage (1961)
- The Mad King of Chichiboo (1963)
- ismo (1964)
- The Dodo Pad (1966-1971, 1973-1992)
- A Dinner of Herbs (1966)
- Fine Day for a Picnic (1968)
- Seven Sunflower Seeds (1968)
- Samson's Hoard (1973)
- A John Verney Collection (1989)

Baronetage of the United Kingdom
Preceded by Ralph Verney	Baronet (of Eaton Square); 1959–1993	Succeeded by John Sebastian Verney
