= Operation Hawthorn =

WW2 series of British Commando raids on Sardinia (1943)

Operation Hawthorn was the codename for a series of British Commando raids on Sardinia during the Second World War. The raids between June and July 1943 were carried out by L Detachment Special Boat Squadron. The raiders were landed either by parachute or submarine and most of those who landed were killed or captured and the detachment had to be reconstituted.

The operation was led by Captain John Verney who commanded the L Detachment of the Special Boat Squad. The operation was planned to span 3 days (from June 30 till July 2) yet was called off after the first day of battle.
