= Reginald Hammond (town planner) =

Surveyor, architect, town planner, senior public servant

Reginald Bedford Hammond (10 September 1894 – 1 October 1970) was a New Zealand surveyor, architect, town planner and senior public servant. He was born in Te Kōpuru, New Zealand, on 10 September 1894.

In 1953, Hammond was awarded the Queen Elizabeth II Coronation Medal.
