= Gerald Rose =

British illustrator (1935–2023)

Gerald Hembdon Seymour Rose (27 July 1935 – 5 May 2023) was a British illustrator of children's books. He won the 1960 Kate Greenaway Medal from the Library Association, recognising the year's best children's book illustration by a British subject, for Old Winkle and the Seagulls, written by his wife Elizabeth (Liz) Rose and published by Faber and Faber.

== Biography ==
Gerald Rose was born in Hong Kong on 27 July 1935. His father was from England and his mother was from Borneo, adopted by a missionary and educated in Hong Kong. During the Second World War, his father became a prisoner of war, and his sister and mother were interned at Stanley civilian detention camp. After the war, he and his sister grew up in their father's home town of Lowestoft. Rose attended the Lowestoft School of Art and the Royal Academy. He married Elizabeth Pretty in 1955, after they met as art students. They had three children and were together until her death in 2020.

Gerald and Elizabeth Rose began to produce children's books, with she writing and he illustrating. How St. Francis Tamed the Wolf was published by Faber in 1958. Gerald was a commended runner-up for the Greenaway Medal next year, when the librarians introduced the distinction, recognising Wuffles Goes to Town. (Note: Today there are usually eight books on the Greenaway shortlist. According to CCSU, some runners-up through 2002 were Commended (from 1959) or Highly Commended (from 1974). There were 99 commendations of both kinds in 44 years, including Rose and Edward Ardizzone when the distinction was inaugurated for 1959.)

In 1979 Gerald Rose won the Premio Critici in Erba in Italy for "Ahhh!" said Stork (Faber, 1977).

Rose lived in Hove, East Sussex, in his later years. He died on 5 May 2023, at the age of 87.

== Selected works ==
- How St. Francis tamed the wolf by Elizabeth Rose (Faber, 1958)
- Wuffles goes to town by Elizabeth Rose (Faber, 1959) —commended for the Greenaway Medal
- Old Winkle and the seagulls by Elizabeth Rose (Faber, 1960) —Greenaway Medal winner
- The emperor's oblong pancake by Peter Hughes (Abelard-Schuman, 1961)
- Story of the Pied Piper by Barbara Ireson (Faber, 1961)
- Charlie on the run by Elizabeth Rose (Faber, 1961)
- Punch and Judy carry on by Elizabeth Rose (Faber, 1962)
- The big river by Elizabeth Rose (Faber, 1962)
- Dan McDougall and the bulldozer by Lydia Pender (Abelard-Schuman, 1963)
- The gingerbread man by Barbara Ireson (Faber, 1963)
- St. George and the fiery dragon by Elizabeth Rose (Faber, 1963)
- Nessie the mannerless monster by Ted Hughes (Faber, 1964)
- The giant who drank from his shoe and other stores by Leónce Bourliaguet (Abelard-Schuman, 1965) ‡
- A sword to slice through mountains, and other stories by Leónce Bourliaguet (Abelard-Schuman, 1967) ‡

‡ The Giant and A Sword are fairy tales selected from Le Marchand de nuages (French language), translated by John Buchanan Brown

- The hopping basket by Paul Jennings (Macdonald, 1965)
- The cat and the devil by James Joyce (Faber, 1965)
- Baron Brandy's boots by Peter Hughes (Abelard-Schuman, 1966)
- The sorcerer's apprentice by Elizabeth Rose (Faber, 1966)
- Alexander's flycycle by Elizabeth Rose (Faber, 1967)
- Jabberwocky, and other poems by Lewis Carroll (Faber, 1968); U.S. title, The Walrus and the Carpenter, and other poems (1969)
- The Dong with a luminous nose and other poems by Edward Lear (Faber,
- The great oak by Elizabeth Rose (Faber, 1970)
- Androcles and the lion by Elizabeth Rose (Faber, 1971)
- The Little Car by Leila Berg, Methuen, 1972)
- Albert and the green bottle by Elizabeth Rose (Faber, 1972)
- Ironhead (Faber, 1973)
- The bird who saved the jungle by Jeremy Kingston (Faber, 1973)
- Wolf! wolf! by Elizabeth Rose (Faber, 1974)
- Stories of Grandmother Oma by Ilse Kleberger (The Bodley Head, 1975)
- Trouble in the ark (Puffin Books/Kestrel Books, 1975)
- "Ahhh!" said Stork (Faber, 1977)
- Watch out! (Kestrel, 1978)
- The tiger-skin rug (Faber, 1979)
- P.B. takes a holiday (Bodley, 1980)
- Rabbit pie (Faber, 1980)
- How George lost his voice (Bodley, 1981)
- Professor Branestawm's pocket motor car by Norman Hunter (Bodley, 1981)
- Professor Branestawm and the wild letters by Norman Hunter (Bodley, 1981)

P.B. on Ice (Bodley 1982)

- Professor Branestawm's building bust-up by Norman Hunter (Bodley, 1982)
- Professor Branestawm's mouse war by Norman Hunter (Bodley, 1982)
- Professor Branestawm's crunch crockery by Norman Hunter (Bodley, 1983)
- Professor Branestawm's hair-raising idea by Norman Hunter (Bodley, 1983)
- The bag of wind (Bodley, 1983)
- Scruff (Bodley, 1984)
- Can hippo jump? (Instructa, 1984)
- The bird garden (Bodley, 1986)
- The lion and the mouse (Methuen, 1988), retold and illustrated by Rose
- Polly's jungle (Reinhardt Books, Viking, 1993)
- Horrible hair (Andersen Books, 2001)
- Millie's big surprise (Andersen, 2003)
