= David Hughes (illustrator) =

Illustrator

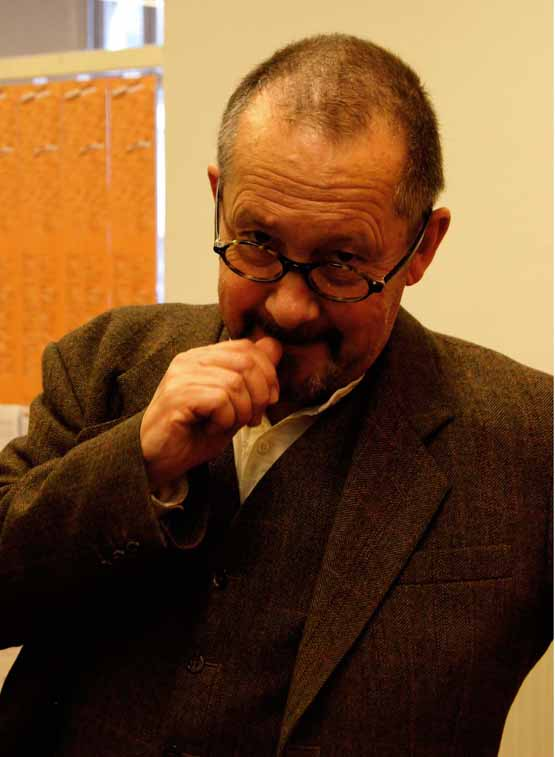
Davig Hughes in Vienna, in 2011.

David Hughes is an artist and illustrator.

== Biography ==
David Hughes, born in Twickenham (in 1952? ') describes himself as "a graphic designer who happens to illustrate." He studied at Twickenham Technical College in the early 1970s. Towards the very end of his course, he discovered an interest in etching and produced "a small series of etchings based on a piece of jazz by Charlie Parker."

After leaving college, he produced his first commissions for The Daily Express's cookery page, but became frustrated and disillusioned by the lack of creativity involved. A lack of "sympathetic advice" saw him abandon drawing for "a year or so," to become a postman. During this time (mid-1970s), he was re-inspired by a Post Office colleague to take up life drawing again, and eventually became aware (through the work of "amongst others, Ian Pollock, Russell Mills and Chloe Cheese") that there was a market for his talents.

=== Granada TV and The Observer ===
In 1980 he was given a job at Granada TV, Manchester as a graphic designer, giving him the financial security of paid employment to experiment artistically. This led to a freelance commission from David Pocknell to "produce 40 black and white pencil and charcoal illustrations" for Eric Morecambe's book "On Fishing," which ultimately inspired Hughes to leave Granada in 1985 to become a full-time illustrator – a decision that some found hard to understand:

"I was in a well-paid job and people felt that I was mad to leave, but I felt a compulsion to be an illustrator."

Another key moment occurred in 1988, when, having long been working on Strat and Chatto by Jan Mark he found that after his "early drawings in pencil/charcoal [were] rejected as too sophisticated," and he felt that pencil-work often suffered from printing techniques he experimented in improving his pen and ink style. "Submitt[ing] a rough pen and ink drawing to Pentagram", he found that they "chose to use it as a finished piece" as the cover to a book by Don Marquis entitled "Archy and Mehitabel". In late 1989, "he was invited by The Observer magazine to produce drawings for a topical weekly medical column, "A Doctor Writes" by Dr. John Collee," first as one of a number of rotating artists, but soon as the solo, regular weekly artist. Describing his aversion to roughing out his work, Hughes notes the immediacy and challenge of producing full work as tending to allow an artist to produce better work:

"Roughs are the kiss of death. I hate doing roughs. . .I don't rough anything out in pencil, it's always pen and ink.., it's the moment; it's the difference between the practice run and the actual reality, it lifts your game. It's really demanding. Pencils easier, lovely, for me it's almost like relaxing."

=== Spoleto festival ===
In 1991, Gian Carlo Menotti, director of the Spoleto festival in Italy and his son Francis Menotti, invited Hughes to produce poster designs to advertise the 1992 festival, having seen his work in The Observer. Hughes also "mounted a major exhibition of his work as part of the festival," which subsequently transferred to the Charleston Festival in South Carolina in 1993.

Hughes was also asked by the Menottis to design an operatic version for their 1993 season of The Rake's Progress, a task he was wary of taking "because of Hockney's famously lauded version". In late 1992, Hockney's opera was staged in Manchester, and Hughes attended, leaving with the opinion that:

"It was very clever, but there was only one scene where I thought 'I can't top that, that's fantastic.'"

Attempting to 'update the biting satire of Hogarth's etchings', Hughes took a satirical approach to 'give the work a contemporary relevance,' utilising all manner of historical styles and imagery associated with sports and gambling, as well as indulging in 'appropriately playful bawdyness'. Hailed by Italian critics as a complete success, Hughes feels in retrospect that its biggest help to himself was that it "made [him] think about colour more, and form."

== Today and beyond ==
After the "adrenalin-fuelled team work of opera", Hughes was 'kept sane' by creating press adverts for American Express as well as being given carte blanch (in 1993) by journalist Christopher Wilson to draw "weekly portrait drawings" for the newspaper Today's "Poison Pen" gossip column.

He was subsequently invited to design another opera for Spoleto - The Cunning Little Vixen for their 1998 season, considering it:

"... totally simplified in comparison. I went the other way, which was good, I'd got all the ornate crap out in Rakes Progress."

His work on The Cunning Little Vixen included 3-dimensional sculptural collages "with letterforms and fiat colour", Ian Massey suggests that Hughes "uses collage elements as accents or as punctuation," and he concurs, noting that he has used simple collage elements from some of his earliest work. Hughes particularly favours the use of postage stamps in his work, not just because of what they evoke:

"... you look at old letters, people write beautifully, and you see the stamps, the seal, the frank mark," but also because he is an avid collector - "cigarette cards, bubble gum cards, stamps, matchbox labels, beermats ..." and the like.

His graphic novel Walking The Dog was published in 2009 to critical acclaim. The Observer wrote: "On the outside, Walking the Dog looks like the kind of hardback a certain kind of man leaves on his coffee table so everyone can see how eclectic he is: expensive, colourful, mildly quirky. Open it up, however, and anarchy reigns."

2015 saw the publication of his next graphic novel, The Pillbox. Neil Mukherjee wrote in The New Statesman: "Hughes has captured something ineluctably English in the combination of seediness, violence, sensationalism and humour; the book's biggest effect, however is the resonance of the present-day story, which will leave at least one haunting question ringing in your head."

Also in 2015, Hughes was commissioned by the Folio Society to illustrate Ken Kesey's novel One Flew Over the Cuckoo's Nest.

== Style and other credits ==
His work incorporates aspects of illustration, graphic design, photography and animation, and his satirical drawings (often on the themes of "war, politics and social crisis"), have appeared in Punch, The Observer and The New Yorker, as well as being exhibited internationally. Hughes states that he rarely uses references, favouring "develop[ing] forms through drawing":

"You don't think of ideas.., you know, sometimes an idea pops into your head but rarely for me. ideas come through drawing."

His work has also appeared in the Evening Standard, GQ, Esquire, Today, The Washington Post and The New Yorker, while Hughes has also produced work for UK TV station Channel 4. His design work for the stage includes two operatic productions at Spoleto, in 1993 and 1998.

Widely acclaimed as a children's book illustrator, Hughes also writes some of the books he illustrates, as well as illustrating the work of others. In autumn 2006, he provided the illustrations of Jan Needle's retelling of Victor Hugo's The Hunchback of Notre-Dame.

== Awards and nominations ==
Strat and Chatto (by Jan Mark), won Hughes the Mother Goose Award for "most exciting newcomer to British children's book illustration" in 1990. Bully was shortlisted for the Nestlé Smarties Book Prize in 1993. Little Robert was selected by the Association of Illustrators in 1997 for Image 22, and was subsequently exhibited at the Royal College of Art, and later touring. In 1999 he received a D&AD Silver Award for his illustrations of Othello.

== Partial bibliography ==
- Strat and Chatto, author Jan Mark. Walker Books, 1990
- Bully. Walker Books, 1992
- Little Robert. Alibaba Verlag, 1996
- Shakespeare's Othello. Alibaba Verlag, 1998
- Silent Night, author Sandy Turner. Atheneum (USA) Walker Books (GB), 2000
- David Hughes: Drawings. Kerber Verlag, 2003
- Victor Hugo's The Hunchback of Notre Dame, adapted by Jan Needle. Walker Books, 2006
- Walking The Dog. Jonathan Cape, 2009
- The Pillbox. Vintage/Jonathan Cape, 2015
