= Kaye Webb =

British editor and publisher (1914–1996)

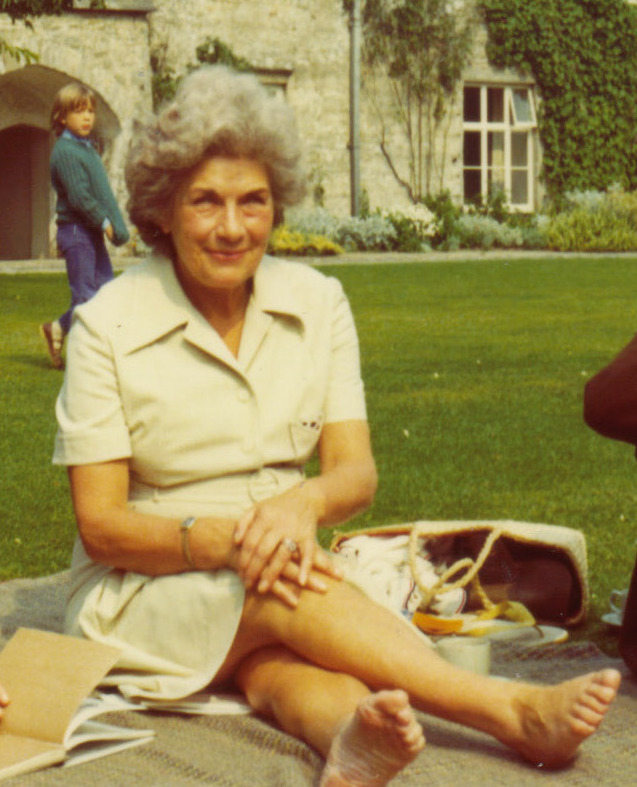
- Webb in 1972
- Born: 26 January 1914
- Died: 16 January 1996 (aged 81)
- Occupations: Editor and publisher
- Spouse: Ronald Searle (1948–1967)
- Writing career
- Notable awards: Eleanor Farjeon Award (1970)

Kathleen ("Kaye") Webb MBE (26 January 1914 – 16 January 1996), was a British editor and publisher. She has been called an "enormously influential children's editor" and "brilliant as an innovator of highly successful marketing strategies". She was awarded the Eleanor Farjeon Award in 1970.

== Early life and education ==
Kathleen Webb was born in Chiswick, London, in 1914, the second of three children of Arthur Webb, a journalist, and Ann (née Stevens), a film and theatre critic. Her paternal great-great-grandfather was W. G. (William George) Webb, publisher of toy theatres in the Victorian era.

Webb was educated first at a dame school, then at Hornsey High School, and then, in 1926, aged twelve, started boarding at Ashburton School, Ashburton, Devon, where her older brother was already a student. Webb herself described her time there as "bullied, miserable, had jaundice", but was inspired and encouraged by the teacher of English, Ben R. Gibbs, author of textbooks about literature and history.

She left the school in 1930, and although Gibbs had suggested that she go on to university, she was sent by her parents to stay with a family in Bruges, Belgium, to be "finished".

== Career ==
Webb's first job after she left school, aged 16, was as an office girl at The Times. In 1931, after her time in Belgium, she was employed as editor's secretary at Picturegoer, where she was "George the Answerman". At some point, she also worked for Mickey Mouse Weekly, where she was paid 2 pence per answer to reply to children's letters. She later worked for motor magazines Caravan World and Sports Car. She joined Picture Post as a secretary in 1938; and in 1941 became assistant editor of the magazine Lilliput.

During the Second World War, Webb volunteered as "an ambulance driver, air-raid warden, canteen worker and member of the Fleet Street Women's Rifle Brigade".

She remained at Lilliput until her marriage in 1948, after which she began working freelance, writing features for the News Chronicle and broadcasting on Woman's Hour, among other commissions. In 1955 she was invited by John Grigg, the owner, to edit the children's literary magazine Young Elizabethan (afterwards retitled Elizabethan). In 1961, she became editor of Puffin Books, remaining until 1979. In 1967 she founded the Puffin Club, which she ran until 1981 (also editing its magazine, Puffin Post).

The publisher Andrew Franklin has described Webb as "the first publisher to turn children’s writers into stars". Nicholas Fisk wrote to her in 1979 that "it was the Kaye Webb 'fluence, permeating the whole field, that was so liberating and encouraging. Whatever the Scene is today, most probably you set it". She had almost complete autonomy over what Puffin published. She ensured that Puffin covers were eye-catching. She preferred publishing texts with complex and sophisticated writing, and emphasised "fantasy and pleasure".

In 1959, she and her husband, Ronald Searle, were invited by the United Nations High Commissioner for Refugees to visit refugee camps in Europe as part of the World Refugee Year of 1959; this resulted in a book, Refugees 1960: A Report in Words and Drawings.

Webb was a castaway on Desert Island Discs in 1993.

== Personal life ==
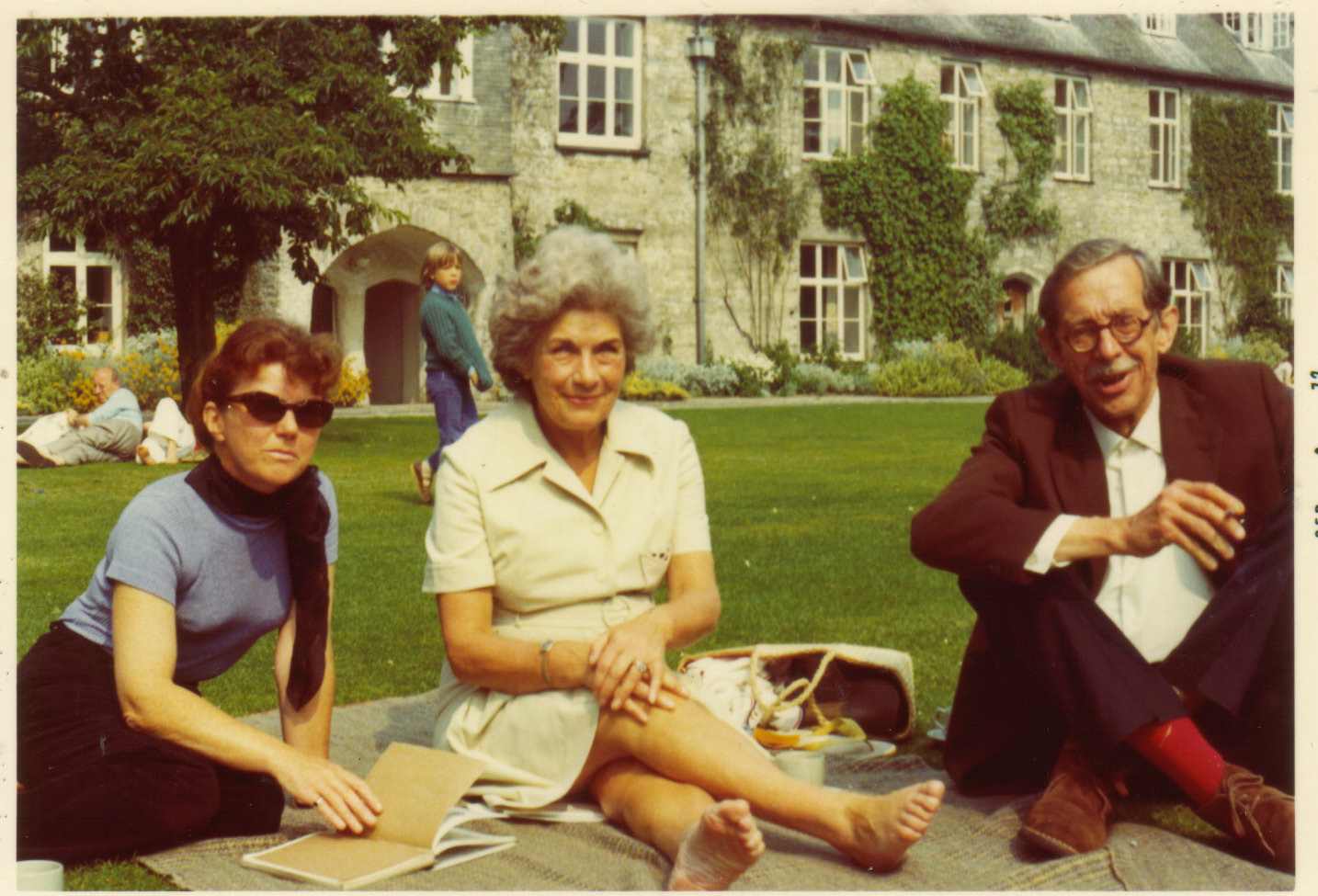
Kaye Webb (centre) with Joan Aiken (left) at Dartington Hall in Devon in 1972

Webb was married three times: each of her marriages ended in divorce. Her third marriage (1948–1967) was to Ronald Searle, who was the father of her son and daughter. "They built a colourful and creative kind of domesticity in a house that would be painted in wild colours and filled with all the bizarre objects they collected on their travels".

Webb was cremated at Kensal Green Cemetery.

== Archives ==
Webb's archive and working library are held in the Seven Stories centre for children's books collection, based in Newcastle upon Tyne.

== Books ==
- Looking at London and People Worth Meeting (1953), News Chronicle, with Ronald Searle
- Paris Sketchbook (1958), Perpetua Books, with Ronald Searle
- The St. Trinian's Story: the Whole Ghastly Dossier (ed) (1959), Perpetua Books
- Refugees 1960: A Report in Words and Drawings (1960), Penguin Books, with Ronald Searle
- A Book of Goblins (1972), with Alan Garner
- I Like This Poem (ed) (1979), Puffin
- Lilliput goes to war (ed) (1985), Hutchinson
- I Like This Story: a taste of fifty favourites (ed) (1986), Puffin
- Meet My Friends: Favourite characters and their adventures (ed) (1991), Viking Kestrel
- Round about six: new stories and poems (ed) (1992), Frances Lincoln
- Family tree: a collection of favourite poems and stories about all kinds of families (ed) (1994), Hamish Hamilton
- Let the sun shine: a read aloud collection (ed) (1998), Frances Lincoln
