= W. Heath Robinson =

British illustrator (1872–1944)

- Born: 31 May 1872; Hornsey Rise, Middlesex, England
- Died: 13 September 1944 (aged 72); London, England
- Occupations: Illustrator, cartoonist and artist
- Known for: Drawings of odd contraptions

William Heath Robinson (31 May 1872 – 13 September 1944) was an English cartoonist, illustrator and artist who drew whimsically elaborate machines to achieve simple objectives.

The earliest citation in the Oxford English Dictionary for the use of "Heath Robinson" as a noun describing any unnecessarily complex and implausible contrivance is from 1917. The phrase "Heath Robinson contraption" perhaps most commonly describes temporary fixes using ingenuity and whatever is to hand, often string and tape, or unlikely cannibalisations. Its continuing popularity was likely linked to Britain's shortages during the Second World War and the need to "make do and mend".

== Early life ==
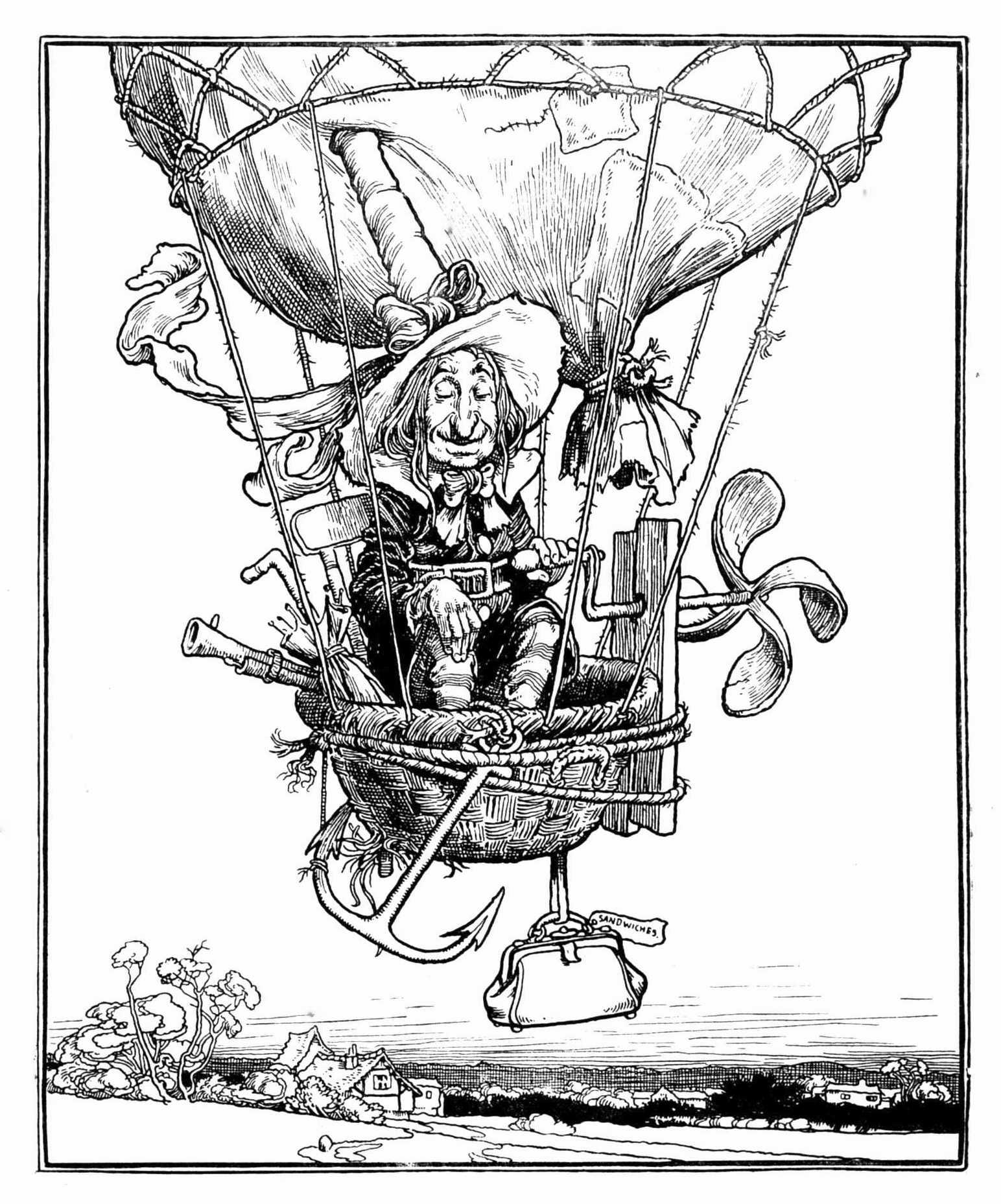
An illustration from The Adventures of Uncle Lubin (1902)

William Heath Robinson was born in Hornsey Rise, London, on 31 May 1872 into a family of artists in Stroud Green, Finsbury Park, North London. His grandfather Thomas, his father Thomas Robinson (1838–1902) and brothers Thomas Heath Robinson (1869–1954) and Charles Robinson (1870–1937) all worked as illustrators. His uncle Charles was an illustrator for The Illustrated London News.

== Career ==
His early career involved illustrating books – among others: Hans Christian Andersen's Danish Fairy Tales and Legends (1897), The Arabian Nights (1899), Tales from Shakespeare (1902), Gargantua and Pantagruel (1904), Twelfth Night (1908), Andersen's Fairy Tales (1913), A Midsummer Night's Dream (1914), Charles Kingsley's The Water-Babies (1915) and Walter de la Mare's Peacock Pie (1916). Robinson was one of the leading illustrators selected by Percy Bradshaw for inclusion in his The Art of the Illustrator (1917–1918) which presented a separate portfolio for each of twenty illustrators. (Note: The portfolio contained: a brief biography of Robinson, an illustration of Robinson at work in his studio, an explanation of Robinson's method of working. This was accompanied by a plate showing an illustration typical of his work and five other plates showing the work at five earlier stages of its production, from the first rough to the just before the finished drawing or colour sketch. Robinson's coloured illustration shows a fantasy feast with naked cherubs.)

Robinson served as a consultant at the Percy Bradshaw's The Press Art School, a school teaching painting, drawing, and illustration by correspondence. The consultants commented on the work submitted by the students. In the course of his work, Robinson wrote and illustrated three children's books, The Adventures of Uncle Lubin (1902), Bill the Minder (1912) and Peter Quip in Search of a Friend (1922). Uncle Lubin is regarded as the start of his career in the depiction of unlikely machines.

During the First World War, he drew large numbers of cartoons, depicting ever-more-unlikely secret weapons being used by the combatants, and the American Expeditionary Force in France.

After the war, his work was included in the painting event in the art competition at the 1932 Summer Olympics.

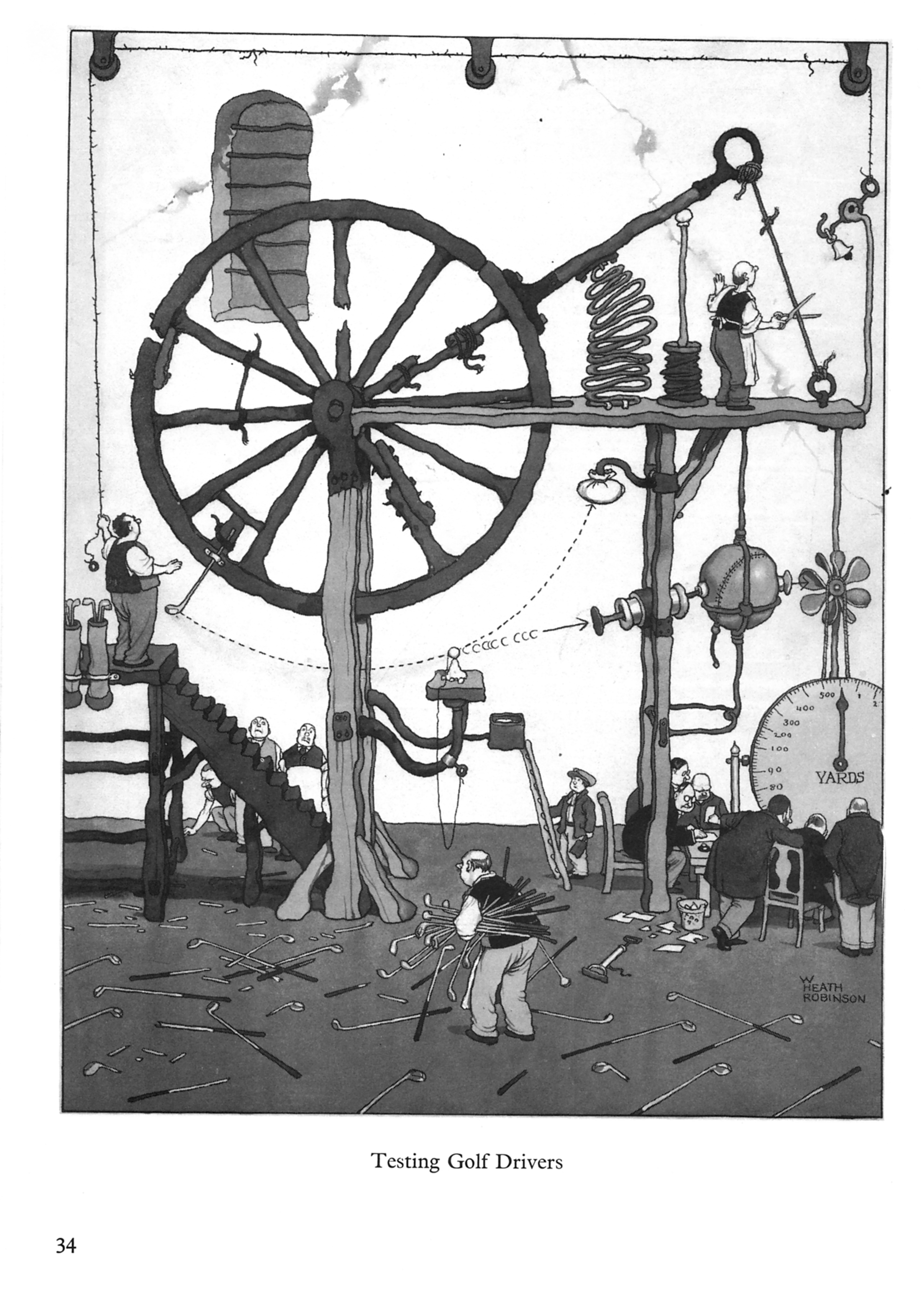
Testing Golf Drivers, a typical "Heath Robinson contraption".

As well as producing a steady stream of humorous drawings for magazines and advertisements, in 1934 he published a collection of his favourites as Absurdities, such as:

- "The Wart Chair. A simple apparatus for removing a wart from the top of the head"
- "Resuscitating stale railway scones for redistribution at the station buffets"
- "The multimovement tabby silencer", which automatically threw water at serenading cats

Most of his cartoons have since been reprinted many times in multiple collections.

In 1935 the Great Western Railway (GWR) commissioned him to create a set of cartoons on the theme of the GWR itself, which they then published as Railway Ribaldry. The Foreword (by GWR) notes that the cartoonist was given a free hand to re-imagine the history of the line for the amusement of its customers. The result is a 96-page softback book with alternating full-page cartoons and smaller vignettes, all on pertinent subjects.

The machines he drew were frequently powered by steam boilers or kettles, heated by candles or a spirit lamp and usually kept running by balding, bespectacled men in overalls. There would be complex pulley arrangements, threaded by lengths of knotted string. Robinson's cartoons were so popular that in Britain the term "Heath Robinson" is used to refer to an improbable, rickety machine barely kept going by incessant tinkering. (The corresponding term in the U.S. is Rube Goldberg, after the American cartoonist born just over a decade later, with an equal devotion to odd machinery. Similar "inventions" have been drawn by cartoonists in many countries, with the Danish Storm Petersen being on par with Robinson and Goldberg.)

One of his most famous series of illustrations was that which accompanied the first Professor Branestawm book written by Norman Hunter. The stories told of the eponymous professor who was brilliant, eccentric and forgetful and provided a perfect backdrop for Robinson's drawings.

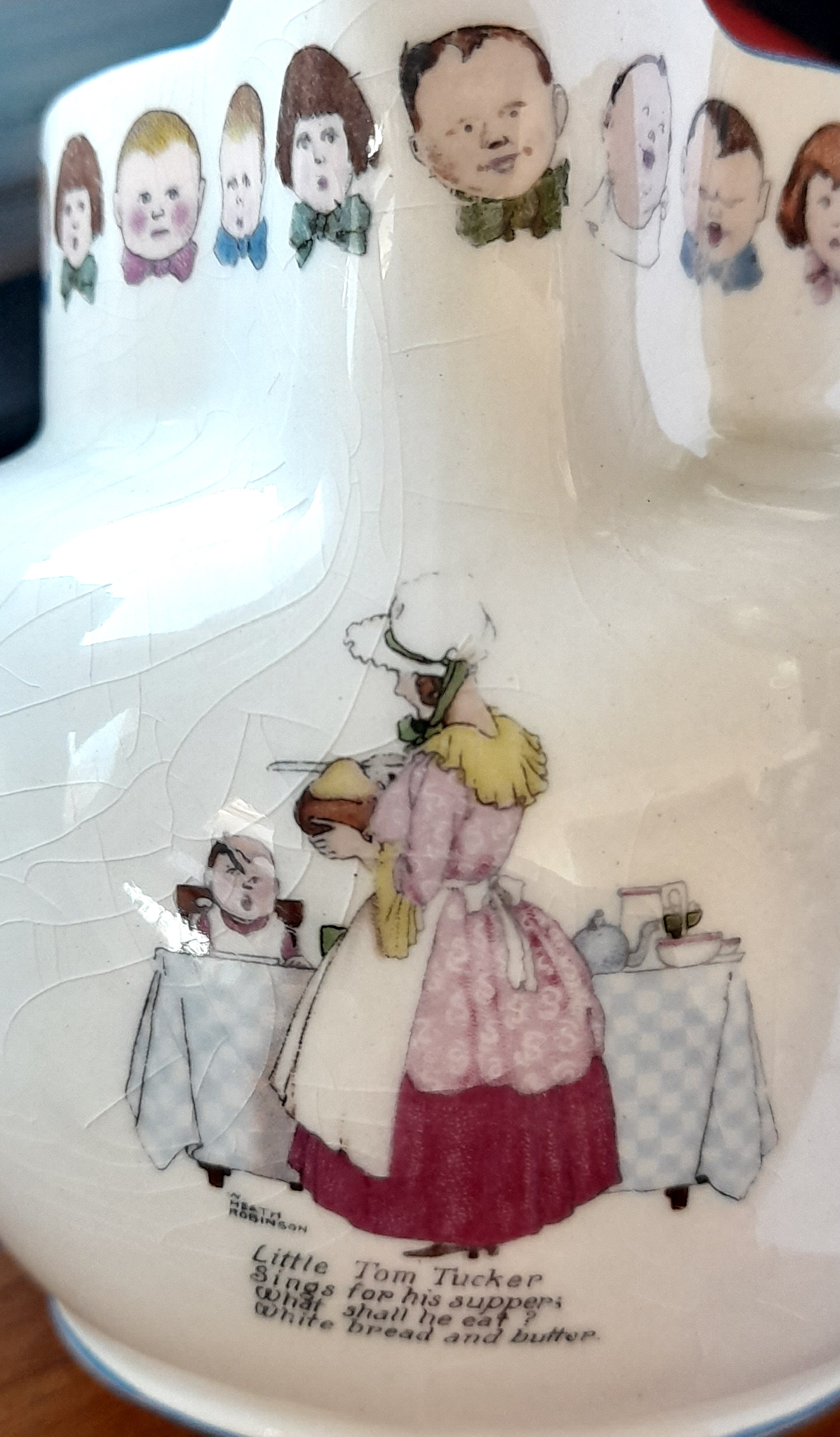
Robinson motifs on "Fairyland on China" nursery jug for Midwinter Pottery, c.1928

Around 1928, Robinson was commissioned to design a range of nursery ware for W. R. Midwinter, a Staffordshire pottery firm. Scenes from sixteen nursery rhymes (some illustrated with more than one vignette) were printed on ware ranging from eggcups to biscuit barrels, each with a decorative border of characterful children's faces. Titled "Fairyland on China", the range was favourably reviewed in the trade press.

The last project Robinson worked on shortly before he died was illustrations for Lilian M. Clopet's short story collection Once Upon a Time, which was published in 1944.

One of the automatic analysis machines built for Bletchley Park during the Second World War to assist in the decryption of German message traffic was named "Heath Robinson" in his honour. It was a direct predecessor to the Colossus, the world's first programmable digital electronic computer.

== Personal life ==
In 1903 he married Josephine Latey, the daughter of newspaper editor John Latey. In 1908 the Robinsons moved to Pinner, Middlesex, with their two children, Joan Ida and Oliver John, both born Islington, and where they had Alan Heath and Quentin Thomas. His house in Moss Lane is commemorated by a blue plaque.

In 1918 the Heath Robinsons moved to Cranleigh, Surrey where they had their fifth child Thomas Latez. Their daughter Ida attended St Catherine's School, Bramley and their son Oliver attended Cranleigh School. Heath Robinson drew designs and illustrations for local institutions and schools. Heath Robinson was too old to enlist for the First World War; he took on two German POWs to garden after the Armistice. In 1929 the Heath Robinsons returned to London where his two oldest children were now working.

== Death and legacy ==
He died in September 1944, during the Second World War, and is buried in East Finchley Cemetery.

The Heath Robinson Museum opened in October 2016 to house a collection of nearly 1,000 original artworks owned by The William Heath Robinson Trust. The museum is in Memorial Park, Pinner, close to where the artist lived and worked.

== In popular culture ==
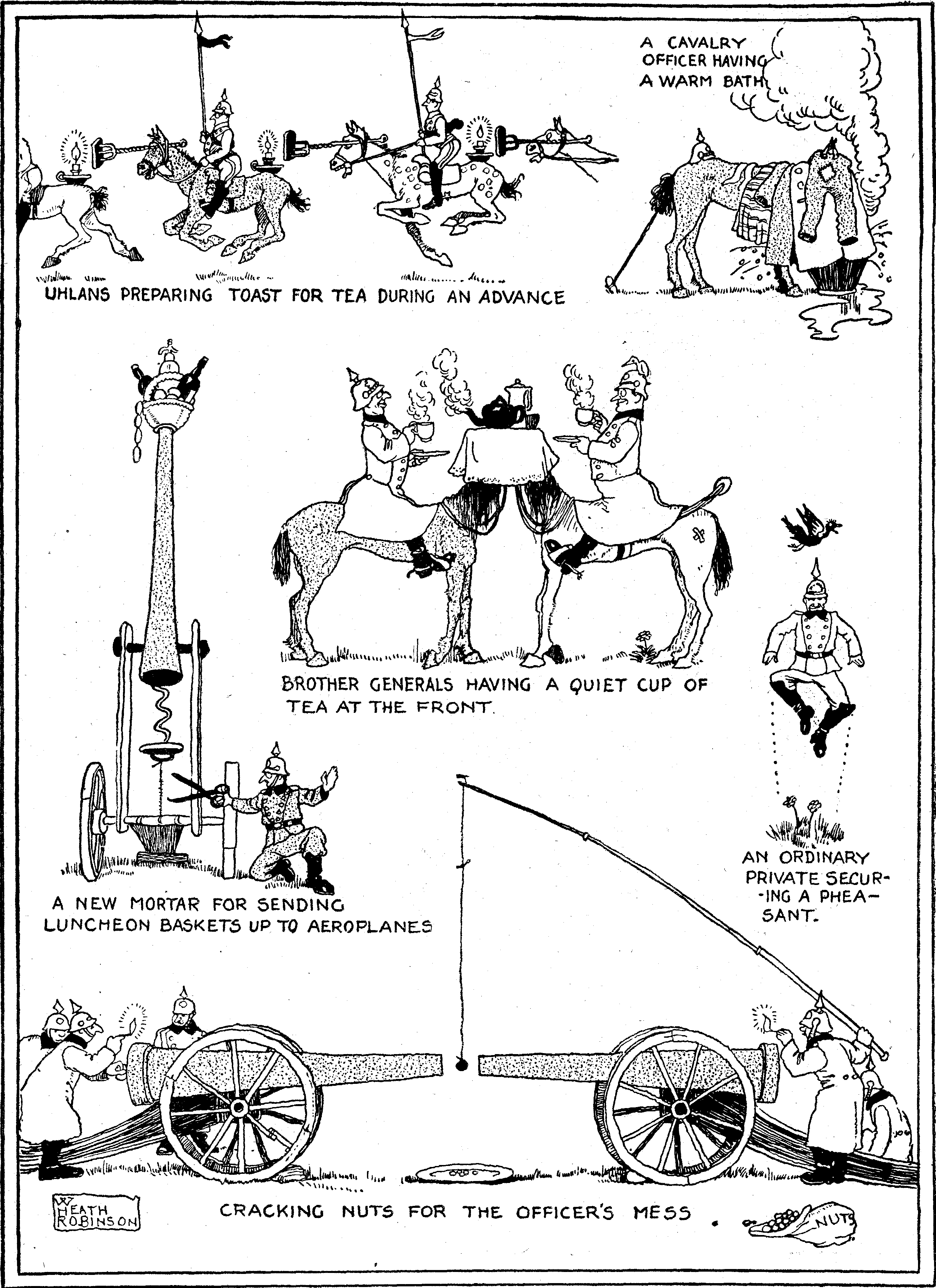
A World War I cartoon by W. Heath Robinson

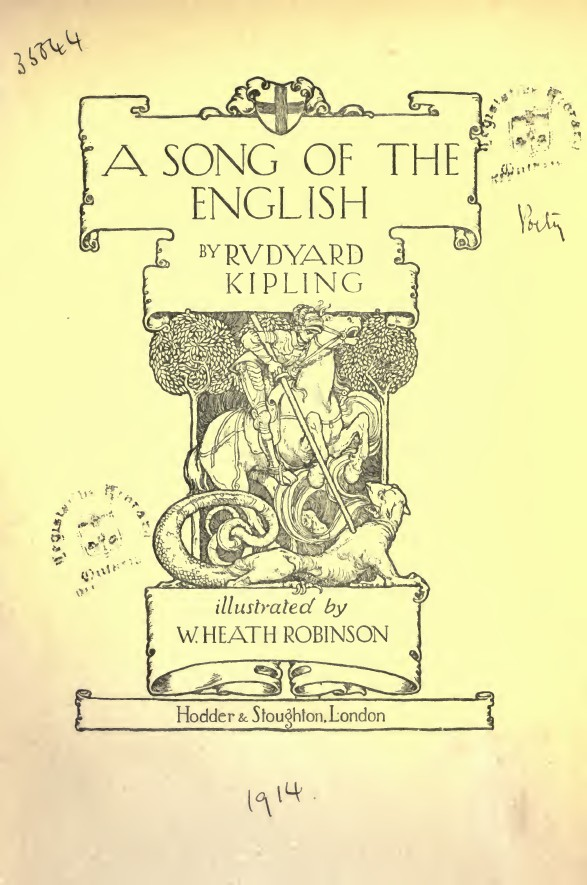
Title page of A Song of the English by Rudyard Kipling, illustrated by W. Heath Robinson, c. 1914 (reprint)

The name "Heath Robinson" became part of common parlance in the UK for complex inventions that achieved absurdly simple results following its use as services slang during the 1914–1918 First World War.

The spotting table used by the Royal Observer Corps during the Battle of Britain to determine the bearing and altitude of an incoming German raid before calling it in to the sector plotting room was known, affectionately, as "the Heath Robinson."

In the Wallace and Gromit films, Wallace often invents Heath Robinson-like machines, with some inventions being direct references.

During the Falklands War (1982), British Harrier aircraft lacked their conventional "chaff"-dispensing mechanism. Therefore, Royal Navy engineers designed an impromptu delivery system of welding rods, split pins and string which allowed six packets of chaff to be stored in the speedbrake well and deployed in flight. Due to its improvised and ramshackle nature it was often referred to as the "Heath Robinson chaff modification".

== Publications ==
- Patterson, R.F., illustrated by W. Heath Robinson, Mein Rant: A Summary in Light Verse of Mein Kampf. 1940
- Robinson, W. Heath, Works of Edgar Allan Poe, Bell. 1900
- Robinson, W. Heath, Uncle Lubin, Richards. 1902
- Robinson, W. Heath, Adventures of Don Quixote, J.M. Dent. 1902
- Kipling, Rudyard, A Song of the English, illustrated by W. Heath Robinson, London: Hodder & Stoughton. 1909
- Robinson, W. Heath, Bill the Minder, Constable & Co., London, 1912
- Robinson, W. Heath, Some "Frightful" War Pictures, Duckworth. 1915
- Robinson, W. Heath, Hunlikely!, Duckworth. 1916
- Robinson, W. Heath, The Saintly Hun: a book of German virtues, Duckworth. 1917
- Robinson, W. Heath, Flypapers, Duckworth. 1919
- Robinson, W. Heath, The Rabelais, Rabelais. [Private Printing] 1921
- Robinson, W. Heath, Peter Quip in Search of a Friend, Partridge 1921
- Robinson, W. Heath, Humours of Golf, Methuen. 1923, [Duckworth. 1973, ISBN 978-0-7156-0915-6]
- Robinson, W. Heath, Heath Robinson's Book of Goblins, Hutchinson & Co, London, 1934
- Robinson, W. Heath, Absurdities: A Book of Collected Drawings, Hutchinson. 1934, [Duckworth. 1975, ISBN 978-0-7156-0920-0]
- Robinson, W. Heath, Railway Ribaldry, Great Western Railway, 1935
- Robinson, W. Heath, Railway Ribaldry, Duckworth. 1935, [Duckworth. 1997, ISBN 978-0-7156-0823-4]
- Robinson, W. Heath, How to Live in Flat, Hutchinson. 1936, [Duckworth. 1976]
- Robinson, W. Heath, How to be a Perfect Husband, Hutchinson & Co, London, 1937
- Robinson, W. Heath, How to Make a Garden Grow, Hutchinson & Co, London, 1938
- Robinson, W. Heath, How to be a Motorist, Hutchinson & Co, London 1939
- Robinson, W. Heath, How to Make the Best of Things Hutchinson & Co London 1941
- Robinson, W. Heath, How to Build a New World Hutchinson & Co, London 1943
- Robinson, W. Heath, How to Run a Communal Home Hutchinson & Co London 1944
- Robinson, W. Heath, My Line of Life, Blackie & Sons. 1938
- Robinson, W. Heath, Let's Laugh: A Book of Humorous Inventions, Hutchinson. 1939
- Robinson, W. Heath, Heath Robinson at War, Methuen. 1942
- Clopet, Lilian M., illustrated by W. Heath Robinson, Once Upon a Time. 1944
- Lewis, John. Heath Robinson Artist and Comic Genius, Barnes and Noble. 1973
- Robinson, W. Heath, Inventions, Duckworth. 1973, ISBN 978-0-7156-0724-4
- De Freitas, Leo John, The Fantastic Paintings of Charles and William Heath Robinson, Peacock/Bantam. 1976
- Robinson, W. Heath, Devices, Duckworth. 1977, ISBN 978-0-7156-1268-2
- Beare, Geoffrey. The Illustrations of W. Heath Robinson, Werner Shaw. 1983
- Beare, Geoffrey. W. Heath Robinson, Chris Beetles. 1987
- Hamilton, James, William Heath Robinson, Pavilion. 1992
- Beare, Geoffrey, The Brothers Robinson, Chris Beetles. 1992
- Beare, Geoffrey, The Art of William Heath Robinson, Dulwich Picture Gallery. 2003
- Robinson, W. Heath, Contraptions, Duckworth. 2007
- Robinson, W. Heath, Britain at Play, Duckworth. 2008
- Beare, Geoffrey, Heath Robinson's Commercial Art, Lund Humphries, 2017
- Hart-Davis, Adam, Very Heath Robinson, Sheldrake Press. 2017

== See also ==
- Norman Hunter (author)
- Professor Branestawm
- Rube Goldberg, American artist with similar cartoon inventions
- Storm P., Danish artist with similar cartoon inventions
- Rowland Emett, British cartoonist with similar physical inventions
