= Drake (surname) =

Drake is an Old English surname of Anglo-Saxon origin.

== Notable people with the surname "Drake" include ==
- Abraham Drake (1715–1781), American military officer
- Alexander Drake (disambiguation), multiple people
- Alfred Drake (1914–1992), American actor
- Alfred George Drake (1894–1915), British soldier
- Alicia Drake (born 1968), British journalist
- Alison Drake (diver) (born 1952), English diver
- Alonzo Drake (1884–1919), English footballer
- Andi Drake (born 1965), English athlete
- Andy Drake (1907–??), American baseball player
- Anthony Drake (1941–2022), English teacher
- Arnold Drake (1924–2007), American writer
- Barbara Drake (1876–1963), English trade unionist
- Bebe Drake (born 1940), American actress
- Benjamin Drake (1794–1841), American historian
- Bernard Drake (1537–1586), English admiral
- Betsy Drake (1923–2015), American actress
- Beverley Drake (born 1956), Guyanese pilot
- Bill Drake (disambiguation), multiple people
- Billy Drake (1917–2011), British pilot
- Bob Drake (disambiguation), multiple people
- Brad Drake (born 1975), American politician
- Bruce Drake (1905–1983), American basketball coach
- Bryan Drake (1925–2001), New Zealand baritone
- Carl John Drake (1885–1965), American zoologist
- Carolyn Drake (born 1971), American photographer
- Celeste Drake, American trade unionist
- Charles Drake (disambiguation), multiple people
- Charlie Drake (1925–2006), British actor
- Chris Drake (disambiguation), multiple people
- Christopher Drake, American film composer
- Clare Drake (1928–2018), Canadian ice hockey coach
- Claudia Drake (1918–1997), American actress
- Clifford B. Drake (1918–1994), American general
- Cyril Drake (1922–1992), English cricketer
- Dallas Drake (born 1969), Canadian ice hockey player
- Daniel Drake (1785–1852), American physician
- Danny Drake (born 1995), New Zealand rugby union footballer
- Darryl Drake (1956–2019), American football player and coach
- Dave Drake (1918–1995), American football coach
- David Drake (disambiguation), multiple people
- Dawsonne Drake (1724–1784), British politician
- D. C. Drake (born 1957), American addictions counselor
- Debbie Drake, American fitness specialist
- Delos Drake (1886–1965), American baseball player
- Diane Drake, American screenwriter
- Dickie Drake (born 1946), American politician
- Dona Drake (1914–1989), American actress
- Dora Drake (born 1993), American politician
- Dorcas Drake (1916–1993), American judge
- Dusty Drake (born 1964), American musician
- Edward Drake (disambiguation), multiple people
- Edwin Drake (1819–1880), American oil driller
- Eli Drake (born 1982), American professional wrestler
- Elias Franklin Drake (1813–1892), American businessman and politician
- Elisabeth Drake (1936–2024), American chemical engineer
- Elizabeth Drake, Australian composer
- Elvin C. Drake (1903–1988), American track coach
- Emilio Drake (1855–1915), Spanish politician
- Eric Drake (1910–1996), British businessman
- Ervin Drake (1919–2015), American songwriter
- Fabia Drake (1904–1990), English actress
- Frances Ann Denny Drake (1797–1875), American actress
- Francis Drake (disambiguation), multiple people
- Frank Drake (1930–2022), American astrophysicist
- Frank Drake (rugby league) (born 1939), Australian rugby league footballer
- Franklin J. Drake (1846–1929), American admiral
- Fred Drake (1958–2002), American musician
- Frederick Seguier Drake (1892–1974), Chinese-born British missionary
- Friedrich Drake (1805–1882), German sculptor
- Gabrielle Drake (born 1944), British actress
- Galen Drake (1905/1906–1989), American radio personality
- Gayla Drake (born 1964), American singer-songwriter
- Geoffrey Drake (1911–1995), English art director
- Grace L. Drake (1926–2020), American politician
- Grae Drake (born 1980), American journalist
- Greg Drake (born 1969), Australian rugby league footballer
- Guy Drake (1904–1984), American singer
- Hamid Drake (born 1955), American percussionist
- Hannah Drake, American poet
- Harold A. Drake (born 1942), American scholar
- Harry Drake (1915–1997), American archer
- Heinrich Drake (1881–1970), German politician
- Howard Drake (born 1956), British diplomat
- Isaiah Drake (born 2005), American baseball player
- Jack Drake (disambiguation), multiple people
- Jackson Drake (born 2003), American professional wrestler
- James Drake (disambiguation), multiple people
- Jay Drake (born 1969), American auto racing driver
- Jeannie Drake (born 1948), British politician
- Jeremey Drake (born 1968), South African cricketer
- Jerry Drake (American football) (born 1969), American football player
- Jessica Drake (born 1974), American actress
- Jim Drake (disambiguation), multiple people
- Jimmy Drake (1912–1968), American humorist
- Joanne M. Drake, American political aide
- John Drake (disambiguation), multiple people
- Johnny Drake (1916–1973), American football player
- Joseph Drake (disambiguation), multiple people
- Judith Drake (1670–1723), English author
- Julius Drake (born 1959), English pianist
- Ken Drake (disambiguation), multiple people
- Kenyan Drake (born 1994), American football player
- Kevin Drake (born 1979), American musician
- Kinsale Drake (born 2000), American poet and playwright
- Kohl Drake (born 2000), American baseball player
- Larry Drake (1949–2016), American actor
- Larry Drake (baseball) (1921–1985), American baseball player
- Leah Bodine Drake (1904–1964), American poet
- Leonard Drake (1954–2010), American basketball coach
- Leta Powell Drake (1938–2021), American broadcaster
- Lindsay Drake (1949–2016), Australian rugby league footballer
- Logan Drake (1899–1940), American baseball player
- Ludwig Von Drake (1961), A cartoon character created by The Walt Disney Company
- Lyman Drake (1852–1932), American baseball player
- Lynwood Drake (1949–1992), American murderer
- Marcus M. Drake (1835–1907), American politician
- Margot Drake (1899–1948), English actress
- Marie Drake (1888–1963), American academic administrator
- Marino Drake (born 1967), Cuban high jumper
- Mary E. Drake (1833–1916), American minister
- Mary Jane Holmes Shipley Drake (1841–1925), American slave
- Maureen Drake (born 1971), Canadian tennis player
- Maurice Drake (1923–2014), British judge
- Max Drake (born 1952), American musician
- Michael Drake (disambiguation), multiple people
- Milton Drake (1912–2006), American lyricist
- Mo Drake (1928–2021), British advertising executive
- Molly Drake (1915–1993), English poet and musician
- Monica Drake (born 1967), American writer
- Montague Garrard Drake (1692–1728), English politician
- Nadia Drake, American journalist
- Naomi Drake (1907–1987), American registrar
- Nathan Drake (disambiguation), multiple people
- Newman E. Drake (1860–1930), American entrepreneur
- Ngaire Drake (born 1949), New Zealand runner
- Nick Drake (disambiguation), multiple people
- Norman Drake (1912–1972), British athlete
- OL Drake (born 1984), English guitarist
- Oliver Drake (disambiguation), multiple people
- Owen Drake (1936–2011), American politician
- Patricia Drake (born 1957), Canadian actress
- Paul Drake (disambiguation), multiple people
- Peggy Drake (1922–2014), Austrian-American actress
- Penny Drake (born 1984), American actress
- Pete Drake (1932–1988), American record producer
- Piper J. Drake (born 1976), Thai-American author
- Priscilla Holmes Drake (1812–1892), American suffragist
- Quaesita Cromwell Drake (1889–1967), American chemist
- Rae Drake (1926–2013), American football player
- Ray Drake (1934–2013), English footballer
- Reinaldo Drake (born 1923), Cuban baseball player
- Richard Drake (1535–1603), English stable master
- Richard F. Drake (1927–2008), American politician
- Rob Drake (born 1969), American umpire
- Robert Drake (disambiguation), multiple people
- Roger Drake (disambiguation), multiple people
- Ron Drake (born 1937), American politician
- Sammy Drake (1934–2010), American baseball player
- Samuel Drake (disambiguation), multiple people
- Sarah Drake (1803–1857), English illustrator
- Sallie Duke Drake (1835–1923), American schoolteacher and principal
- Shane Drake, American music video director
- Simon Drake (born 1957), English musician
- Simon Drake (writer) (born 1975), Australian writer
- Sofia Drake (1662–1741), Swedish landowner
- Solly Drake (1930–2021), American baseball player
- Stan Drake (1921–1997), American cartoonist
- St. Clair Drake (1911–1990), American sociologist
- Stephanie Drake, American actress
- Steve Drake (born 1954), American actor
- Stillman Drake (1910–1993), Canadian historian
- Susannah Drake (born 1965), American architect
- Sylvia Drake (1784–1868), American tailor
- Tasman Drake (1884–1946), New Zealand clergyman and cricketer
- Ted Drake (1912–1995), British cricketer
- Tharon Drake (born 1992), American swimmer
- Thelma Drake (born 1949), American politician
- Theodore Drake (1891–1959), Canadian pediatrician
- Theodore W. Drake (1907–2000), American cartoonist
- Thomas Drake (disambiguation), multiple people
- Tom Drake (disambiguation), multiple people
- Tony Drake (disambiguation), multiple people
- Tracy Drake (1864–1939), American hotelier
- Troy Drake (born 1972), American football player
- Vern Drake (born 1946), Australian footballer
- Vicky Drake (born 1946), also known as Vicky Brago-Mitchell, American fractal artist, former dancer
- Walter Drake (1879–1941), New Zealand rugby union footballer
- Wiley Drake (born 1943), American minister
- William Drake (disambiguation), multiple people
- Yadir Drake (born 1990), Cuban baseball player
- Zak Drake (born 1991), Canadian soccer player

== Fictional characters ==
- Adam Drake, ex-counterespionage agent and mystery solving attorney on The Edge of Night
- Alex Drake (Pretty Little Liars), a character on the television series Pretty Little Liars.
- Alex Drake (Ashes to Ashes), in the TV series Ashes to Ashes
- Charlie Drake, a character in the 1985 American science fantasy movie Explorers
- Charlotte Drake, a character on the television series Pretty Little Liars
- Bobby Drake (Iceman), a Marvel Comics superhero, and a founding member of the X-Men
- Dèmon Drake, in the TV series Charmed
- Dinah Drake (Black Canary) of DC Comics
- Doofus Drake, in the animated series DuckTales
- Downy O'Drake, a Disney character
- Evan Drake, a character in the TV sitcom Cheers
- Frankie Drake, private investigator and the titular character in the Canadian TV series Frankie Drake Mysteries
- John Drake (Danger Man), in the TV series Danger Man
- Ludwig Von Drake, a Disney cartoon character
- Mark Drake, a Colonial Marine smart gunner in the film Aliens
- Mary Drake (Pretty Little Liars), a character on the television series Pretty Little Liars
- Mons Drake, in Tensou Sentai Goseiger
- Nathan Drake, the main character of the video game series Uncharted
- Noah Drake, a character on the soap opera General Hospital
- Patrick Drake, a character on the soap opera General Hospital
- Paul Drake (character), a private detective in various media of the Perry Mason franchise
- Dr. Reese Drake, a supporting character in the Dinosaur King franchise
- Robert Putney Drake, in the Illuminatus! Trilogy of books
- Temple Drake, a character in novels written by William Faulkner
- Tim Drake, a character in the comic series DC Comics
- Will Drake, in American Horror Story: Hotel
- Zoe Drake, a main character in the Dinosaur King franchise

== See also ==
- Drake (disambiguation)
- Drake (given name)
- Admiral Drake (disambiguation)
- General Drake (disambiguation)
- Governor Drake (disambiguation)
- Senator Drake (disambiguation)
