= USS Carpellotti =

USS Carpellotti has been the name of more than one United States Navy ship, and may refer to:

- USS Carpellotti (DE-548), a destroyer escort cancelled during construction in 1944
- USS Carpellotti (DE-720), a destroyer escort converted during construction into the fast transport USS Carpellotti (APD-136), in commission from 1945 to 1958
