= Jim Drake =

James or Jim Drake may refer to:

== Arts and entertainment ==
- Nervous Norvus (1912–1968), American musician, performing name of Jimmy Drake
- James Drake (photographer) (1932–2022), American photographer
- Jim Drake (director) (1944–2022), American film and television director
- James Drake (visual artist) (born 1946), American artist

== Science and medicine ==
- James Drake (physician) (1667–1707), English doctor and political writer
- Jim Drake (engineer) (1929–2012), American aeronautics engineer
- James F. Drake (born 1947), American plasma physicist
- James A. Drake (ecologist) (born 1954), American ecologist

== Others ==
- James M. Drake (1837–1913), American soldier who fought in the American Civil War
- James Drake (politician) (1850–1941), Australian politician, member of the first federal ministry
- James Drake (engineer) (1907–1989), British chartered civil engineer
- Jim Drake (rugby league) (1931–2008), English rugby league footballer
- Jim Drake (labor organizer) (1937–2001), American labor and community organizer
- James A. Drake (academic administrator) (born 1944), American university president
- James Drake (wrestler) (born 1993), English professional wrestler
