= John Drake =

John Drake may refer to:

- John Drake (mayor) (died c. 1433), medieval mayor of Dublin
- John Drake (died 1628) (1556–1628), English politician
- John Drake (privateer) (c. 1560–1600s), English pirate
- Sir John Drake, 1st Baronet (1625–1669), English politician
- John Drake (1657–1716) (1657-1716), English politician
- John R. Drake (New York politician) (1782–1857), U.S. Representative from New York
- John Poad Drake (1794–1883), inventor and artist
- John Drake (1826–1895), American hotel magnate
- John M. Drake (1830–1913), Union Army officer during the American Civil War
- John Drake (1872–1964), American hotel magnate
- John Drake (cricketer) (1893–1967), English cricketer
- Johnny Drake (1916–1973), American football player
- John W. Drake, American microbiologist
- John Drake (rugby union) (1959–2008), New Zealand rugby footballer
- John Drake, singer for the band The Amboy Dukes

== Character ==
- John Drake (Danger Man), character of the eponymous series

== See also ==
- Jack Drake (disambiguation)
- John Drake Sloat
