= General Drake =

General Drake may refer to:

- Charles Bryant Drake (1872–1956), U.S. Army brigadier general
- Charles C. Drake (1887–1984), U.S. Army brigadier general
- Clifford B. Drake (1918–1994), U.S. Marine Corps major general
- Francis M. Drake (1830–1903), U.S. Army brigadier general

== See also ==
- Edmund Drake-Brockman (1884–1949), Australian Army major general
