= Samuel Drake =

Samuel Drake may refer to:

- Samuel Drake (divine) (1622–1679), English Royalist divine
- Samuel Drake (antiquary) (c. 1687–1753), English antiquary; grandson of the above
- Samuel Gardner Drake (1798–1875), American antiquarian
- Samuel Adams Drake (1833–1905), American journalist
- Sammy Drake (1934–2010), American baseball player

== See also ==
- Francis Samuel Drake (historian) (1828–1885), American historian
- Sir Francis Samuel Drake, 1st Baronet (1729–1789), officer of the Royal Navy
