= Charles Drake =

Charlie or Charles Drake may refer to:

== Actors ==
- Charles Drake (actor) (1917–1994), American actor
- Charlie Drake (1925–2006), English comedian, actor and singer
  - Charlie Drake (TV series), British television comedy series

== Military men ==
- Charles Drake (Garrard baronets) (1755–1817), English MP for Amersham, styled Charles Drake Garrard after inheriting estate
- Charles D. Drake (1811–1892), American senator from Missouri who served in U.S. Navy
- Charles Bryant Drake (1872–1956), American brigadier who served in Philippines
- Charles C. Drake (1887–1984), American brigadier in World War I and II

== Others ==
- Charles George Drake (1920–1998), Canadian neurosurgeon
- Charles L. Drake (1924–1997), American geologist
- Charles Drake (American football) (1981–2012), safety for NFL and NFL Europe

== Characters ==
- Charles Drake (Pretty Little Liars), gender reassigned villain known as Charlotte Drake
