= Frank Drake (disambiguation) =

Frank Drake (1930–2022) was an American astrophysicist and astrobiologist.

Frank Drake may also refer to:

- Frank Drake (rugby league) (born 1939), Australian rugby league player
- Frank Drake (comics), comic book character

== See also ==
- Franklin J. Drake (1846–1929), American admiral
- Francis Drake (disambiguation)
