= Bartholomew Clerke =

16th-century English jurist and politician

Bartholomew Clerke (1537?–1590) was an English jurist, politician and diplomat. He became Dean of the Arches and a contemporary of Edward de Vere, 17th Earl of Oxford.

== Background ==
He was grandson of Richard Clerke, gentleman, of Livermere in Suffolk, and son of John Clerke of Wells, Somerset, by Anne, daughter and heiress of Henry Grantoft of Huntingdonshire. He was born about 1537 in Surrey. He received his education at Eton College, and was elected to King's College, Cambridge, being admitted scholar on 23 August 1554 and fellow on 24 August 1557. He proceeded B.A. in 1559, and commenced M.A. in 1562. He also studied at Paris, where he was admired for his oratory, and he was offered a salary of three hundred crowns if he would read a public lecture at Angers; but this he declined. About 1563 he was professor of rhetoric at Cambridge. When Queen Elizabeth visited the university in August 1564, he took a part in the philosophy act which was kept in her majesty's presence, and made an oration to her when she visited King's College. He was one of the proctors of the university for the academical year beginning in October 1564.

== Early career ==
On the death of Roger Ascham he was recommended to succeed him as Latin secretary to the queen by Sir William Cecil, Robert Dudley, 1st Earl of Leicester, and Walter Haddon. The office, however, was granted by the Queen to John Wolley. About the same time he was accused of unsoundness in religion, but defended himself. In 1569 he was again elected proctor of the university. On this occasion he was publicly charged with unsoundness in religion and reproached for having been rejected at court. The Earl of Leicester, in a letter to the vice-chancellor and regents of the university, dated 11 May 1569, vindicated Clerke's reputation.

To the parliament which assembled on 2 April 1571 he was returned as one of the members for the borough of Bramber in Sussex, and on the 19th of the month he took part in a debate on the bill against usury, his speech containing quotations from Aristotle, Plato, St. Augustine, and the psalmist. In that year he accompanied to Paris Lord Buckhurst, sent as ambassador to the French court to congratulate Charles IX on his marriage. He resided with his lordship for some time after his return to England, and he was also held in esteem by Edward de Vere, 17th Earl of Oxford, to whom he was a tutor at Cambridge University. He was also a correspondent of the Earl.

It was in 1571 that Nicholas Sanders printed his book, De visibili Ecclesiae Monarchia. Lord Burghley and Archbishop Matthew Parker thought it ought to receive a substantial answer from a jurist, and Clerke was asked. Burghley desired some public testimony from the university respecting Clerke's conduct: the vice-chancellor and John Whitgift as Master of Trinity College, testified on 6 December 1572 to his good reputation for learning. While engaged in refuting Sanders, Clerke was accommodated with a room in the Arches by favour of Archbishop Parker, who himself assisted in preparing the reply, which was then scrutinised and corrected by Burghley before it was sent to the press, as Fidelis servi subdito infideli responsio. It was printed by John Day, and trouble was taken with the typography, but Day asked Parker for a quid pro quo in the shape of help with setting up a book shop.

== Ecclesiastical lawyer ==
On 14 January 1573 Clerke became a member of the College of Advocates at Doctors' Commons, and on 3 May 1573 he was constituted Dean of the Arches. The queen commanded the archbishop to remove Clerke, claiming that he was too young to hold such a post. He successfully resisted the attempt to remove him, supported by the archbishop. In November 1573 he occurs in a commission from the archbishop to visit the church, city, and diocese of Canterbury. About the same time he was appointed a master in chancery. His name occurs in the high commission for causes ecclesiastical on 23 April 1576, and he became archdeacon of Wells about the beginning of 1582.

== Diplomat ==
In December 1585 he and Henry Killigrew were sent to Flanders to co-operate with the Earl of Leicester, being appointed members of the council of state. On 10 March 1586 Clerke delivered an oration in Leicester's name, on his arrival in Amsterdam, and in October following he was despatched to England by Leicester on a special mission to the Queen. In 1587 he was again sent to the Low Countries, with his friends Lord Buckhurst and Sir John Norris, to allay the discontent which had been excited by the Earl of Leicester's proceedings in Holland, and to open the way for a peace with Spain.

== Retirement ==
For some years his residence was at Mitcham in Surrey, and he was lord of the manor of Clapham there. He died on 12 March 1590, and was buried in the old church at Clapham. By his wife Eleanor (née Haselrigge) he had a son, Sir Francis Clerke of Merton in Surrey.

== Works ==
His works included a translation into Latin of The Book of the Courtier from the Italian original Il Cortegiano of Baldassare Castiglione (STC 4782). It first appeared in early 1572 as Balthasaris Castilionis Comitis De Curiali siue Aulico, prefaced with commendatory Latin epistles by the Earl of Oxford, Thomas Sackville, Lord Buckhurst, and John Caius. It was subsequently edited by Samuel Drake, in 1713.
