= Alex Drake =

Alex Drake may refer to:

- Alex Drake (Ashes to Ashes), a fictional character in BBC drama Ashes to Ashes
- Alex Drake (Pretty Little Liars), a fictional character on the American television series Pretty Little Liars
- Alex Drake (Power Rangers Time Force), a fictional character in Power Rangers Time Force)

== See also ==
- Alexander Drake (disambiguation)
