= George Washington Cutter =

American poet

- Born: George Washington Cutter
- Died: 1865; Washington, D.C., U.S.
- Occupation: Poet
- Writing career
- Notable works: Buena Vista and Other Poems (1848); Song of Steam and Other Poems (1857); Poems, National and Patriotic (1857)

George W. Cutter (died 1865) was an American poet.

According to biographical material provided by a cousin, he was christened George Wales Cutter. The date and place of his birth is disputed, claimed by or traced to either Toronto, (then York)Canada or Massachusetts.

He settled in Terre Haute, Indiana, in 1826, where he studied and practiced law and ultimately was elected to the Indiana legislature. After marrying actress Frances Denny Drake, widow of actor, Alexander Drake, who was known in national theater circles as "Mrs. Drake, Star of the West", in 1839, the Cutters resided in Terre Haute before relocating to the Drake residence in Covington, Kentucky.

He fought in the Mexican War, serving under G. Zachary Taylor, and later entered the political field, where he soon became known as a brilliant speaker. His most celebrated poems are "The Song of Steam" "The Song of the Lightning", "E Pluribus Unum" and "Buena Vista". Cutter's marriage to Frances Denny Drake ended in divorce and, though he remarried, much of the remainder of his life was troubled by bouts with intemperance.

He died in Washington, D.C., in 1865.

His works were published under the respective titles:

- Buena Vista and Other Poems (1848)
- Song of Steam and Other Poems (1857)
- Poems, National and Patriotic (1857)
