= Oscar Hartzell =

American con man (1876–1943)

- Born: Oscar Merril Hartzell; January 6, 1876; Monmouth, Illinois, U.S.
- Died: August 27, 1943 (aged 67); Medical Center for Federal Prisoners, Missouri, U.S.
- Burial place: Monmouth Cemetery, Monmouth, Illinois, U.S.
- Occupations: Farmer, realtor, deputy sheriff, politician, promoter
- Years active: 1905–1933
- Known for: Confidence scam involving the estate of Sir Francis Drake
- Criminal charges: Fraud
- Criminal penalty: 10 years imprisonment
- Criminal status: Deceased
- Spouse: Daisey Rees (m. 1895)
- Partner: Inez Collis (1917–1933)
- Children: 3

Oscar Merril Hartzell (January 6, 1876 – August 27, 1943) was an American farmer, realtor, deputy sheriff, politician, and promoter. He became well-known as a con man who ran a confidence scam by claiming rightful ownership of the estate of Francis Drake.

== Early life ==
Oscar Merril Hartzell was born in Monmouth, Illinois, on January 6, 1876, as the eldest child to John Henry Hartzell and his wife, Emma Louisa (née Shaw). He had three siblings: Clinton Sylvester Hartzell, Canfield C Hartzell and Pearl May Palmer (née Hartzell).

Hartzell was a high school drop out.

== Career ==
Hartzell worked on his family's farm, eventually inheriting it from his father following his death on September 14, 1905, at the age of 52. He was 29 years old at the time of his father's death. Due to difficulties running the farm, he fell into financial trouble. He moved to Des Moines, Iowa, where he worked as a realtor, and then as a deputy sheriff. He worked a number of jobs, including in politics and as a promoter.

Hartzell was drafted to join the Army on September 12, 1918, during World War I.

== Sir Francis Drake estate scam ==
According to Hartzell, in 1915, he met con artists Oseida "Sudie" Whiteaker and Milo Lewis, who promised to turn his mother's $6,000 into $6M by giving him a share of the held fortune of the English explorer and privateer Francis Drake. When he realized the deal was a confidence game, he decided to use it to his own advantage, and joined in.

Hartzell contacted many Iowans who had the surname Drake. He claimed he was a distant relative and had discovered that the estate of Drake had never been paid to his heirs, that it had gathered interest for the last 300 years and was now worth $100B. He invited all these families to invest in his campaign to sue the British government for the money and assured them that everyone would make $500 for every dollar they invest. He said the inheritance would include the whole city of Plymouth, in Devon, South West England.

Tens of thousands of Americans sponsored Hartzell, sometimes with all the money they had. He later expanded his con to people without the surname Drake and outside of Iowa.

Around 1917, Hartzell travelled to London in order to meet with the heir of the Drake estate. He ended up staying, and lived an opulent lifestyle. He continued to tell the families who had invested in the "campaign" that he was negotiating with the British government and needed more money for expenses. His agents in the Midwest, sometimes of whom believed in the scheme themselves, collected the money.

On August 9, 1922, the British Home Office informed the American Embassy that there was no unclaimed Sir Francis Drake estate. Hartzell explained that the estate was not unclaimed because it belonged to Drexel Drake (a nonexistent Colonel) and therefore to Hartzell.

Since Hartzell had not broken any British laws the British police could not arrest him. The Federal Bureau of Investigation (FBI) investigated and announced that Drake's wife, Elizabeth (née Sydenham; 1562–1598), had duly inherited her husband's estate in 1597, the year after Drake's death. That information did not stop the donations. When Ed Smith, Iowa Secretary of State, tried to convince the state legislature to act, the public and Hartzell's supporters protested, saying they could donate to whomever they wanted so the legislature did nothing.

After the Wall Street crash of 1929 and during the Great Depression, Hartzell's followers seemed to become even more desperate and continued to send him money.

On October 11, 1930, John Maynard Keynes, arguing in an article for deficit spending to alleviate the Depression, mentioned that Queen Elizabeth I had invested Drake's loot—which Drake had given to The Crown—for the benefit of the United Kingdom. Hartzell seized this as a proof of his claims and his agents in the United States spread copies of the article to his followers.

Eventually United States Postal Service inspector John Sparks, with help from the British police, seized some of Hartzell's agents and forced them to reveal the scam. At the same time, Scotland Yard arrested some of his British associates. Britain deported him to the US and he was sent to Iowa for trial in 1933. By this time, according to U.S. officials, he had collected $80,000 from the scam.

Hartzell was tried in Sioux City, Iowa, in 1933. His followers sent him a total of $68,000 for his defence. The federal prosecutor called University of Michigan Professor Arthur Lyon Cross to testify as an expert witness that Drake had no heirs and his wealth reverted to the Crown. A federal jury convicted Hartzell, in part, because Cross was able to definitively convince them that Hartzell’s claim of being an heir to wealth was an impossibility.. He was convicted of fraud in November 1934, sentenced to ten years in prison, and fined $2,000. By that time, he had run his scam for over 15 years. After losing an appeal in 1935, he was sent to Federal Correctional Institution, Leavenworth in Kansas. Even after his sentencing, some of his agents collected more donations—$500,000 for the next year.

In total, Hartzell swindled at least $2M ($37.2 million in 2025) from 70,000 to 80,000 people.

Hartzell was eventually judged to be insane, being diagnosed with paranoid schizophrenia. He was transferred to Medical Center for Federal Prisoners, a male federal prison in Springfield, Missouri.

== Personal life ==
Hartzell married Daisey F Rees in Warren, Illinois, on November 20, 1895. During his time in London, he took a mistress, Inez Marian Collis, who was 16 years his senior. He had three children.

== Death ==
Hartzell died from throat cancer at the Medical Center for Federal Prisoners in Springfield, Missouri on August 27, 1943. He was 67. He was interred at Monmouth Cemetery in Monmouth, Illinois.
