= Ken Drake =

Ken Drake may refer to:

- Ken Drake (photographer) (born 1970), Australian photographer
- Ken Drake (actor) (1921–1987), American actor
