= Old Forge, Lackawanna County, Pennsylvania =

Borough in Pennsylvania, US

Old Forge, Pennsylvania
- Borough
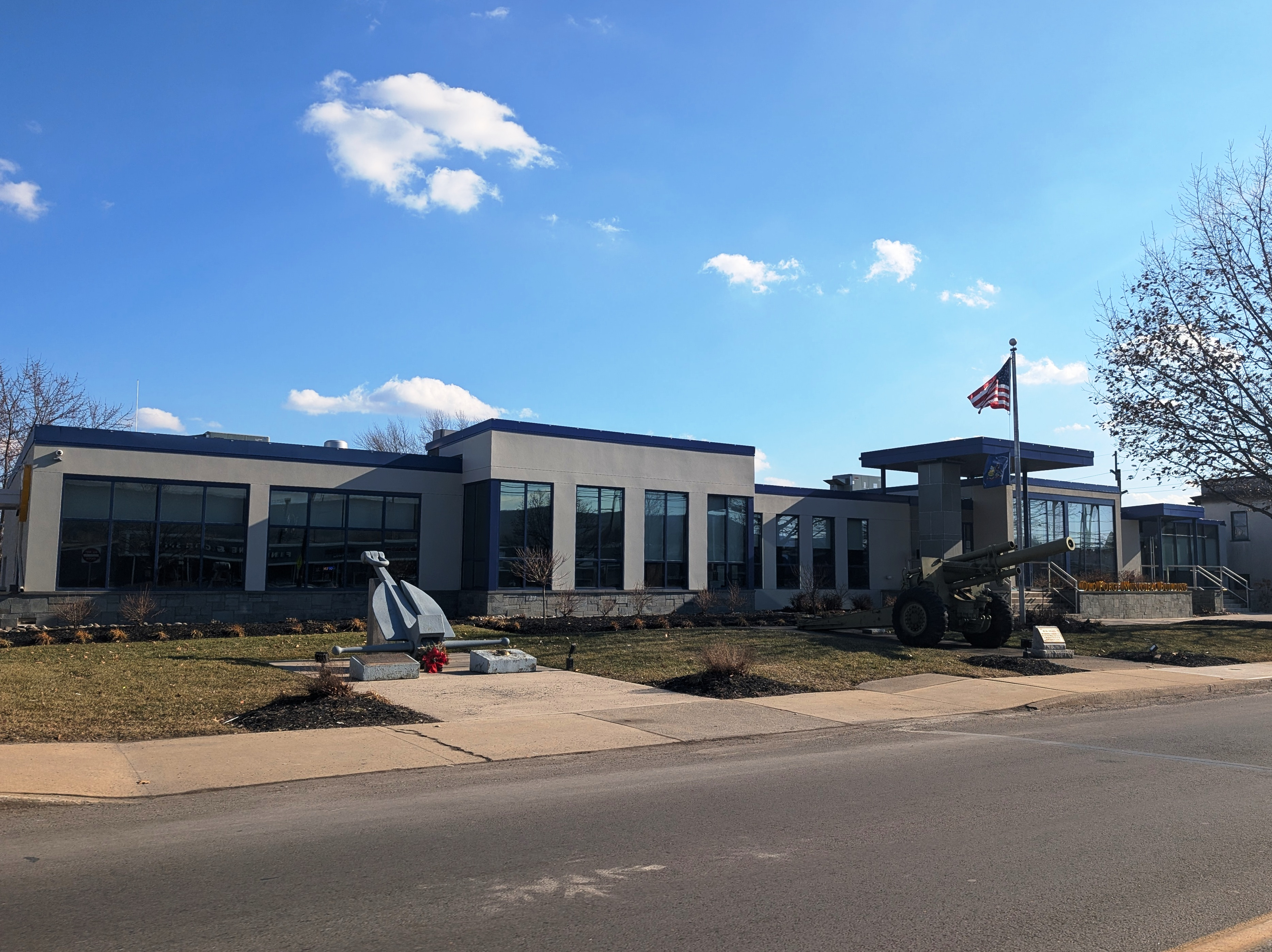
- Old Forge Municipal Building
- Nicknames: Ol' Forge, Pizza Capital of the World
- Location of Old Forge in Lackawanna County, Pennsylvania

- Location in Pennsylvania Location in the United States
- Coordinates: 41°22′11″N 75°44′18″W
- Country: United States
- State: Pennsylvania
- County: Lackawanna
- Established: 1899

Government
  - Type: Mayor/Council
  - Mayor: Bob Legg

Area
  - Total: 3.43 sq mi (8.88 km^{2})
  - Land: 3.43 sq mi (8.88 km^{2})
  - Water: 0 sq mi (0.00 km^{2})
- Elevation: 732 ft (223 m)

Population (2020)
  - Total: 8,497
  - Density: 2,479.3/sq mi (957.25/km^{2})
- Time zone: UTC-5 (EST)
  - Summer (DST): UTC-4 (EDT)
- ZIP code: 18518
- Area code: 570
- FIPS code: 42-56576
- GNIS feature ID: 1215326
- Website: www.oldforgeborough.com

Old Forge is a borough in Lackawanna County, Pennsylvania, United States. The population was 8,524 at the 2020 census. It is located 5 miles (8 km) southwest of downtown Scranton and 12 miles (19 km) northeast of Wilkes-Barre.

== Geography ==
Old Forge is located at 41°22′11″N 75°44′18″W (41.369679, −75.738297). The borough has a total area of 3.5 square miles (9.1 km^{2}), all of which is land. The major body of water flowing through the borough is the Lackawanna River, part of the Upper Susquehanna-Lackawanna Watershed. Acid mine drainage into the Lackawanna River from a borehole in Old Forge is the largest point source of pollution in the Chesapeake Bay watershed.

== Climate ==
The climate of Old Forge is classified as humid continental. The town generally has hot and humid summers. Old Forge's warmest month (on average) is July at 83 °F (28 °C) and the coldest month (on average) being January at 34 °F (1 °C). Old Forge occasionally has some severe weather, mostly thunderstorms and flooding. Winters bring snow, with some years bringing low amounts of snow to others with several feet of snow caused by Nor'easters. One of the more notable nor'easters to hit Old Forge was the Blizzard of 1993 when Old Forge received approximately 21" of snow from that storm. On March 13–14, 2017, Winter Storm Stella brought 23" of snow to Old Forge, one of the largest in Old Forge's history. The winter months also bring more dangerous ice, sleet, and freezing rain. Tropical storms and hurricanes occasionally survive up the coast of the Atlantic Ocean and cross into Pennsylvania.

Climate data for Old Forge
Month	Jan	Feb	Mar	Apr	May	Jun	Jul	Aug	Sep	Oct	Nov	Dec	Year
Mean daily maximum °F (°C)	34 (1)	37 (3)	47 (8)	61 (16)	75 (24)	80 (27)	83 (28)	82 (28)	74 (23)	65 (18)	52 (11)	39 (4)	61 (16)
Mean daily minimum °F (°C)	18 (−8)	20 (−7)	28 (−2)	38 (3)	48 (9)	62 (17)	71 (22)	60 (16)	53 (12)	42 (6)	34 (1)	24 (−4)	42 (5)

== History ==
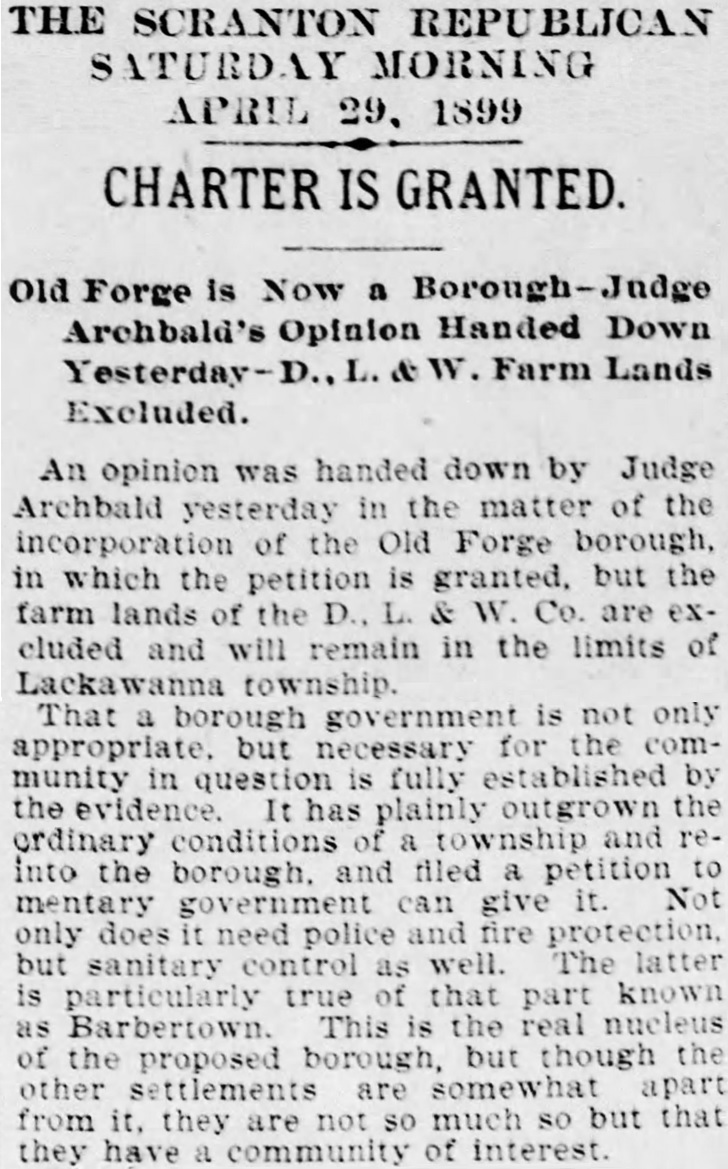
Old Forge becomes a borough

The history of Old Forge can be traced back to 1789 and Rev. Dr. William Hooker Smith, a Presbyterian minister and doctor, who was an army surgeon in the American Revolutionary War. During the 1820s, Charles Drake operated the only stagecoach inn between Wilkes-Barre and Carbondale. Drake's son, Ebenezer, secured a post office for Old Forge in 1848, where he served as postmaster until 1885. On May 26, 1871, Old Forge Township was designated, as it previously had been part of Lackawanna Township. Old Forge Borough was incorporated on May 2, 1899.

=== Coal mining era ===
During the early part of the twentieth century, the borough's main industry was anthracite coal mining along with a minor silk throwing industry. During the 1920s, the Dutchess Underwear Company came to Old Forge where many residents worked until the 1950s, when the company relocated to Georgia. It was during this time that the borough's population reached an all-time high of over 14,000 residents. As a result of a major coal mining strike, many people left Old Forge and the population dropped to 12,661 according to the 1930 census.

The 1930s brought a new industry to the borough in that of textiles. This was an important addition to the industry of Old Forge during World War II. By the 1950s, the Maxson Corporation began operating its electronics factory, at one point employing as many as 1,000. The Knox Mine Disaster on January 22, 1959 virtually put an end to all anthracite coal mining in the area.

=== Pizza ===
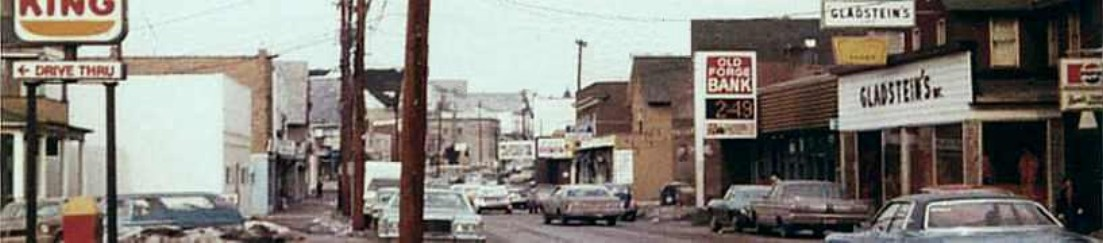
Old Forge in the late 1970s

Immigrants from Italy arrived in the early 1900s to work in the coal mines. Bob Mulkerin, the mayor of the town, explained that the immigration mostly came from Felitto, a mountain town in the Cilento National Park near Salerno. The Italian immigrants were treated poorly and often the subject of discrimination during this time period. Italian miners could take the pizza down into the mines for lunch and enjoy it cold. Old Forge style pizza was made popular by Nonna Ghigiarelli, who made it for regulars of her and her husband's bar back in 1926. The 1960s saw the Butler Silk Mill and the Maxson Corp. close. The Gabriel Sporting Goods Company moved into a portion of the Maxson plant. Brooks Manufacturing was the major employer in town during this time. By the 1970s, though, Brooks was undergoing a major reduction in workforce and eventually closed in the 1980s to be replaced by its current tenant, King Coil Mattress Co.

The 1960s and 1970s saw the growth of what has become the borough's trademark, the pizza business. The origins of selling pizza are believed to be rooted within the Ghigiarelli family, when Mrs. Ghigiarelli used to serve her homemade pizza to coal miners who gathered to play cards. This led to what is known as "Old Forge Pizza" and over time began to use the moniker “Pizza Capital of the World”. This pizza is typically rectangular in shape with a balanced sauce, and topped with a blend of cheeses – usually mozzarella and white American or mozzarella and mild cheddar – on a crispy thick crust. Old Forge style pizza is served at many restaurants in Northeastern Pennsylvania.

== Government ==
Old Forge consists of a burgess (mayor) and a seven-seat council government, established in 1899. The first election was held on May 13, 1899. In 1901, a petition was filed to divide the borough into wards, and in 1903, six election wards were established. In 1927, the Sixth Ward was divided into three districts. The term "burgess" was used until 1961, when the office became known as "mayor". Here is a history of the burgesses/mayors in Old Forge:

Name	Term
Andrew Kennedy	1899–1900
R.W. Rees (Resigned)	1900–1902
J.N. Cooke	1902–1903
John Hayes (Grandfather of Congressman Joseph McDade)	1903–1906
Edward Garvin	1906–1909
William Repp	1909–1913
Martin Memlo	1913–1917
Michael Farrell	1917–1921
Frank Costanza	1921–1925
Frank Burger	1925–1929
Louis Pagnotti	1929–1933
Thomas Carey	1933–1937
James Tedesco	1937–1945
Bart Petrini	1945–1965
Edmund Wascavage	1965–1969
Elio Ghigiarelli	1969–1973
Edward Salerno	1973–1977
Frank DeGennari	1977–1981
Anthony Cristiano	1981–1985
Amil Bertocki	1985–1989
Anthony Trotta	1989–1993
Edward Kania	1993–1997
Philip Tagliaterra	1997–2001
Anthony Torquato	2001–2005
Michelle Avvisato	2005–2014
Robert Mulkerin	2014–2018
Robert Legg	2018–Present

== Neighborhoods ==
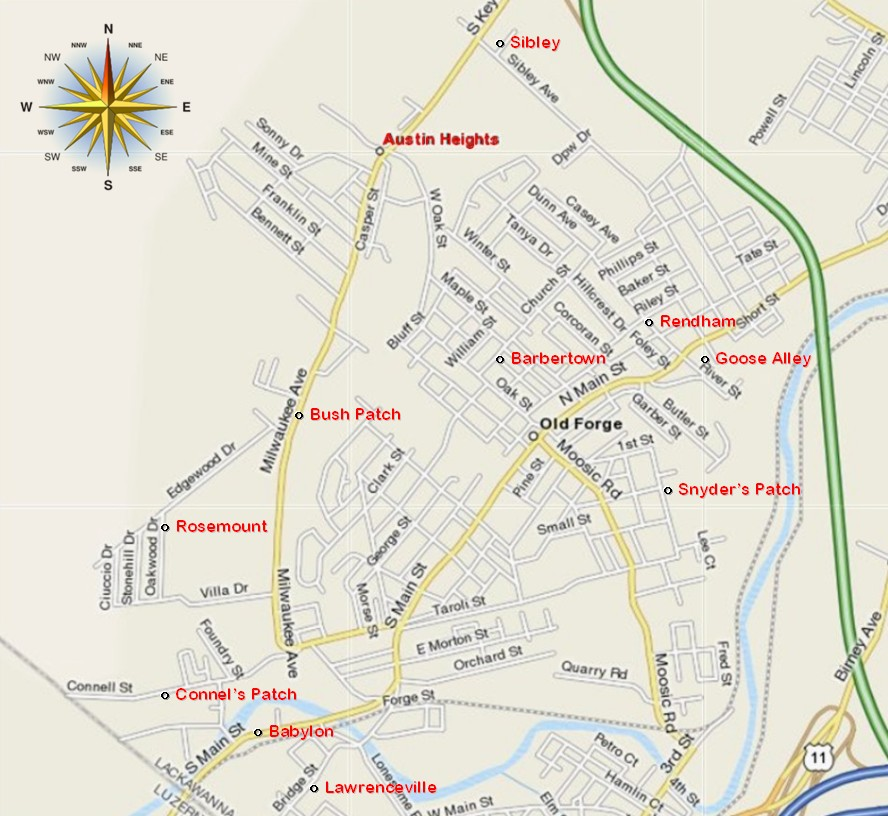
Sections of Old Forge

There are many sections of Old Forge named in the early years of the borough, which still are referenced today.

Name	Location
Austin Heights	West Northwest, above Milwaukee Avenue
Babylon	South, in lower Old Forge along Main Street
Barbertown	North Northwest, area near Vine Street
Bush Patch	West, area along Milwaukee Avenue
Connel's Patch	West Southwest, in lower Old Forge on the north side of the Lackawanna River
Goose Alley	East Southeast, area of River Street
Lawrenceville	South, area along Bridge Street
Rendham	Northeast, area around Dunn Avenue
Rosemount	North, near Keyser Avenue
Sibley	North Northwest, area along Keyser Avenue between Oak Street and Sibley Avenue
Snyder's Patch	East, area behind Moosic Road between First & Hoover Streets

== Schools ==
The Old Forge School District is a diminutive, suburban, public school district serving the municipality of Old Forge, a suburb of Scranton in Lackawanna County. The District is one of the 500 public school districts of Pennsylvania. The District encompasses 3 square miles (7.8 km^{2}). According to 2000 federal census data, it served a resident population of 8,798. By 2010, the District's population declined to 8,310 people. The educational attainment levels for the Old Forge School District population (25 years old and over) were 89.4% high school graduates and 22.6% college graduates.

== Sports ==
The Old Forge Blue Devils have a long, rich history in high school sports. During the 1950s and 1960s, Old Forge dominated the area in football and basketball, winning several league championships and conference titles. During the 1950s, Old Forge compiled the highest winning percentage for football in the entire state. The school has been to a state championship game five times and has won twice. In 1932, Old Forge beat Strong Vincent High from Erie 24-19 for the state basketball championship. At the time, schools were not divided by class, thus there was only one state champion in the whole state. Sixty years later in 1992, Old Forge won the Class ""AA" state championship in baseball by beating Ridgway 15-5. In 2009, the girls' high school softball team lost 1–0 in the state championship. In the 2013–2014 school year, the Old Forge football team and the girls' basketball team both reached the state finals.

Old Forge has had a long-standing rivalry with neighboring town Taylor that goes back to 1939 when Old Forge beat the Taylor Trojans 2–0 in the first meeting of the two teams on the football field. Thus began the "Old Forge-Taylor Football Rivalry". This rivalry turned into the "Old Forge – Riverside Rivalry" when Taylor and Moosic combined. A tradition began in 1940 of the two teams meeting on Thanksgiving Day. This continued until 1974. The rivalry was on hiatus from 1989 until 2000, when the two teams met, renewing the heated rivalry between the two neighboring towns.

== Demographics ==
Historical population
Census	Pop.	Note	%±
1900	5,630		—
1910	11,324		101.1%
1920	12,237		8.1%
1930	12,661		3.5%
1940	11,892		−6.1%
1950	9,749		−18.0%
1960	8,928		−8.4%
1970	9,522		6.7%
1980	9,304		−2.3%
1990	8,834		−5.1%
2000	8,798		−0.4%
2010	8,313		−5.5%
2020	8,497		2.2%
2021 (est.)	8,552		0.6%

As of the census of 2010, there were 8,313 people, 3,734 households, and 2,276 families residing in the borough. The population density was 2,375.1 inhabitants per square mile (917.0/km^{2}). There were 4,040 housing units at an average density of 1,154.3 per square mile (445.7/km^{2}). The racial makeup of the borough was 96.9% White, 1% African American, 0.1% Native American, 0.7% Asian, 0.1% Pacific Islander, 0.5% from other races, and 0.7% from two or more races. Hispanic or Latino of any race were 2.8% of the population.

There were 3,734 households, out of which 22.8% had children under the age of 18 living with them, 46% were married couples living together, 11.1% had a female householder with no husband present, and 39% were non-families. 33.4% of all households were made up of individuals, and 15.7% had someone living alone who was 65 years of age or older. The average household size was 2.23 and the average family size was 2.85.

In the borough the population was spread out, with 18.5% under the age of 18, 61.1% from 18 to 64, and 20.4% who were 65 years of age or older. The median age was 45.1 years.

The median income for a household in the borough was $35,090, and the median income for a family was $46,152. Males had a median income of $34,159 versus $22,887 for females. The per capita income for the borough was $19,228. About 4.7% of families and 6.6% of the population were below the poverty line, including 5.0% of those under the age of 18 and 12.0% ages 65 or older.

=== Ethnicity ===
The ancestry of Old Forge varies among many heritages, with Italian being the most dominant with 41.3% of the population claiming Italian heritage, which ranks as the 6th highest percentage of Italians of any community in the U.S. according to the 2010 U.S. Census. Many of the Italian immigrants came from Felitto.

- Italian – 41.3%
- Polish – 22.6%
- Irish – 21.8%
- German – 13.2%
- Russian – 8.6%
- Welsh – 7.9%
- English – 4.5%
- Slovak – 3%
- Lithuanian – 1.7%
- Scotch-Irish – 1.4%
- Ukrainian – 1.3%
- Arab – 1.2%

== Notable people ==
- Rosalie Allen, singer
- Cletus Joseph Benjamin, American prelate of the Roman Catholic Church
- Louis Carpellotti, World War II hero and namesake of the USS Carpellotti (APD-136)
- Chuck Cherundolo, professional football player
- Charles Bryant Drake, Brigadier General, US Army
- Allan Jones, actor
- Glynn Lunney, NASA engineer
- Robert Nardelli, CEO of Chrysler Corporation
- John Petercuskie, football coach
- Paul Plishka, opera singer
- Anthony Rysz, Polish National Catholic bishop
- Carmel Sirianni, American politician
- Lou Tomasetti, professional football player
- John Wansacz, American politician and businessman
- Cathie Wright, American politician

== Sister city ==
- (Italy) Felitto
