= Senator Drake (disambiguation) =

Charles D. Drake (1811–1892) was a U.S. Senator from Missouri. Senator Drake may also refer to:

- Elias Franklin Drake (1813–1892), Minnesota State Senate
- Grace L. Drake (fl. 1980s–2000s), Ohio State Senate
- Joseph Drake (soldier) (1806–1878), Mississippi State Senate
- Thomas J. Drake (1797–1875), Michigan State Senate
