= David Drake (disambiguation) =

David Drake (1945–2023) was an American author of science fiction and fantasy literature.

David Drake may also refer to:

- Dave Drake (1918–1995), American football coach
- David Drake (actor) (born 1963), American author and performer
- David Drake (chef), American chef and restaurateur
- David Drake (potter) (c. 1801–c. 1870s), African-American potter
- David W. Drake (1834–1909), American farmer, musician and the founder of the Stonewall Brigade Band
- David Drake (died 1922), Australian shipbuilder, see David Drake Limited
- David Drake (comics), DC Comics character also known as Typhoon
