= William Drake =

William Drake may refer to:

== Arts and entertainment ==
- William Henry Drake (painter) (1886–1926), American painter and illustrator
- William A. Drake (1899–1965), American screenwriter
- Bill Drake (1937–2008), American radio programmer
- William D. Drake (born 1962), British musician
- William Drake (character), a Marvel Comics character

== Politics and law ==
- Sir William Drake, 1st Baronet (1606–1669), English lawyer and Member of Parliament
- Sir William Drake (died 1690) (c. 1651–1690), English Member of Parliament for Amersham, 1669–1690
- Sir William Drake, 4th Baronet (1658–1716), English Member of Parliament
- William Drake (1723–1796) (senior), English Member of Parliament for Amersham, 1746–1796
- William Drake (1747–1795) (junior), English Member of Parliament for Amersham, 1768

== Other ==
- William Drake (antiquary) (1723–1801), Church of England priest, antiquary and philologist
- William Henry Drake (1812–1882), British public servant and colonial treasurer of Western Australia
- William Tasman Drake (1884–1946), New Zealand clergyman and cricketer
- Bill Drake (baseball) (1895–1977), American Negro league baseball player
- Bill Drake (American football) (1950-2018), American football player
- Billy Drake (1917–2011), British RAF pilot
- Bill Drake (rugby league) (1931–2012), English rugby league footballer
- William Drake (organ builder) (1943–2014), British organ builder

== See also ==
- William Tyrwhitt-Drake (1785–1848), Tory English Member of Parliament for Amersham from 1810
- William Drake Westervelt (1849–1939), writer on Hawaiian history and legends
