= Francis Drake (disambiguation) =

Sir Francis Drake (1540–1596) was an Elizabethan privateer and naval hero.

Francis Drake may also refer to:

- Francis Drake (died 1634) (1573–1634), MP for Amersham and Sandwich; nephew of the privateer Francis Drake and Sir Richard Grenville
- Sir Francis Drake, 1st Baronet (1588–1637), nephew of the naval hero
- Sir Francis Drake, 2nd Baronet (1617–1662), son of 1st Baronet
- Sir Francis Drake, 3rd Baronet (1642–1718), nephew of 2nd Baronet
- Sir Francis Drake, 4th Baronet (1694–1740), son of 3rd Baronet; MP for Tavistock
- Sir Francis Henry Drake, 5th Baronet (1723–1794), Master of the Household and MP for Bere Alston
- Francis Drake (antiquary) (1696–1771), English antiquary and surgeon
- Francis William Drake (1724–1787), third son of Francis Henry; British admiral and Governor of Newfoundland
- Sir Francis Samuel Drake, 1st Baronet (1729–1789), fourth son of Francis Henry; British admiral
- Francis Drake (diplomat) (1764–1821), British diplomat
- Francis M. Drake (1830–1903), American politician
- Francis Drake (MP for Surrey), English politician
- Francis John Drake (1860–1929), medical superintendent at Launceston Hospital
- Francis Samuel Drake (historian) (1828–1885), American historian

== Other uses ==
- Sir Francis Drake (TV series), British television series 1961–1962
- Sir Francis Drake, one of the GWR 3031 Class locomotives that were built for and run on the Great Western Railway between 1891 and 1915
- Sir Francis Drake Channel, a strait in the British Virgin Islands
- HMS Sir Francis Drake, a Royal Navy frigate involved in the 1811 invasion of Java

== See also ==
- Frank Drake (disambiguation)
- Frances Drake (1912–2000), American actress
- Frances Ann Denny Drake, American actress
