= Admiral Drake =

Admiral Drake may refer to:

- Francis Drake (c. 1540–1596), English Navy vice admiral
- Sir Francis Samuel Drake, 1st Baronet (1729–1789), British Royal Navy rear-admiral
- Francis William Drake (1724–1788/89), British Royal Navy vice admiral
- Franklin J. Drake (1846–1929), U.S. Navy rear admiral
- Admiral Drake (horse), French thoroughbred racehorse
