= Michael Drake =

Michael Drake may refer to:

- Michael Julian Drake (1946–2011), American astronomer
- Michael V. Drake (born 1950), American physician and university president
- Mike Drake, American football player and coach
- Ol Drake (Oliver Michael Drake, born 1984), British guitarist
- Michael Drake, British actor in 1939 melodrama The Return of Carol Deane
- Michael Drake, character in 1978 American horror film Dracula's Dog
- Michael Drake, American baseball player, see List of 2006 Seattle Mariners draft picks
- Michael Drake, unsuccessful candidate in 2010 Weymouth and Portland Borough Council election in Great Britain
- Michael Drake, candidate in 2015 Prince Edward Island general election in Canada
