= James Drake (photographer) =

American photographer (1932–2022)

- Born: James Alexander Drake Jr. April 6, 1932; Philadelphia, Pennsylvania, U.S.
- Died: January 10, 2022 (aged 89); Philadelphia, Pennsylvania, U.S.
- Occupation: Photographer
- Spouse: Jean Casten (died. 2016)
- Children: 2
- Website: jamesdrakephotography.com

James Alexander Drake Jr. (April 6, 1932 – January 10, 2022) was an American photographer. He was best known for his work for the sports magazine Sports Illustrated.

Drake died from lung cancer at his home in Philadelphia, Pennsylvania, on January 10, 2022, at the age of 89.
