= Vicky Brago-Mitchell =

American artist (b. 1946)

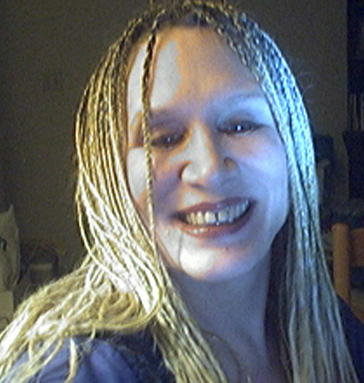
- Vicky Brago-Mitchell, 2007
- Born: Victoria Jane Bowles; September 30, 1946 (age 79); Yakima, Washington, United States
- Other names: Victoria Reich, Vicky Drake
- Education: Stanford University, California State University, Fullerton
- Occupations: Fractal artist, digital artist, music producer, former dancer

Vicky Brago-Mitchell (née Victoria Jane Bowles; born September 30, 1946), formerly known by stage name Vicky Drake, is an American fractal artist and digital artist. She was known in the 1960s as a Stanford University student who, while working as a topless dancer, ran for student body president. She won the preliminary election, but lost to eventual Earth Day national coordinator Denis Hayes in a two-person runoff election.

== Biography ==
She was born on September 30, 1946, in Yakima, Washington. Daughter of a Methodist minister, she grew up as Victoria Jane Bowles in small towns in Washington, Oregon and Montana.

After graduating from high school, she attended Stanford University as a scholarship student majoring in Spanish. In Spring 1967 she was the first American college girl to appear nude in a campus magazine, the Stanford Chaparral. In 1968 she began working at night as a topless dancer under the stage name "Vicky Drake", and ran for student body president with a campaign poster that was a photo of herself posing nude on the Stanford Mausoleum. This story was first reported by the San Francisco Examiner, May 1, 1968, then carried by wire services Associated Press and United Press International and published in newspapers worldwide. A feature about her titled Student Body appeared in the September 1968 edition of Playboy and was reprinted in the 1971 Playboy special edition The Youth Culture. She graduated from Stanford University in 1970.

From 1970 to 1974 she toured the United States and Japan as a stripper, then stayed in Japan for two years, working as a translator, photographer and English teacher. In 1977, she obtained a teaching credential from California State University, Fullerton, then worked as an elementary school teacher until 2005.

In 2002, she produced a CD of her husband composer John Mitchell’s chamber music for string instruments, recorded in Moscow, and in 2006 arranged the production of a double CD of his chamber music for woodwind instruments by MMC Recordings in Boston, featuring clarinetist Richard Stoltzman. In 2005 her fractal art appeared on the cover of Latin Finance magazine and was shown at the Biennale Internazionale dell’Arte Contemporanea in Florence, Italy.
