= Mike Drake =

American football player and coach (1957–2005)

Biographical details
- Born: January 15, 1957; Toledo, Ohio, US
- Died: August 12, 2005 (aged 48); Stow, Ohio, US

Playing career

Football
- 1975–1978: Western Michigan
- Position: Running back

Coaching career (HC unless noted)

Football
- 1984–1986: Western New Mexico

Michael Alan Drake (January 15, 1957 – August 12, 2005) was an American football player and coach. He was a star running back at Western Michigan University in Kalamazoo, Michigan. He served as the head football coach at Western New Mexico University in Silver City, New Mexico from 1984 to 1986.
