= USS Carpellotti (APD-136) =

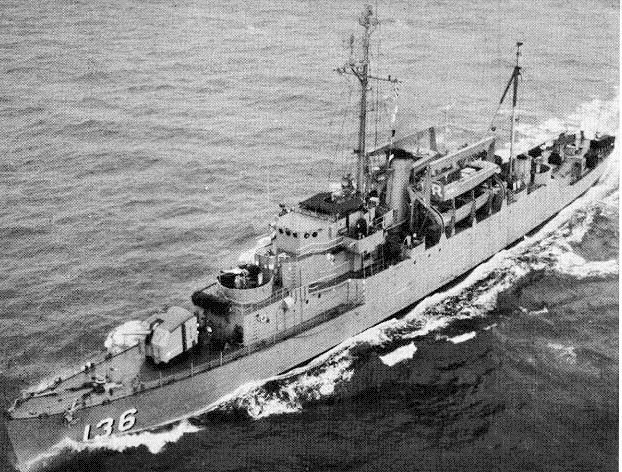
- USS Carpellotti (APD-136)

History

United States
- Name: USS Carpellotti
- Namesake: Louis J. Carpellotti
- Ordered: 1942
- Builder: Defoe Shipbuilding Company, Bay City, Michigan
- Laid down: 31 October 1944
- Launched: 10 March 1945
- Commissioned: 30 July 1945
- Decommissioned: 21 April 1958
- Stricken: 1 December 1959
- Fate: Sold for scrap, 1966

General characteristics
- Class & type: Crosley-class high speed transport
- Displacement: 1,450 long tons (1,473 t)
- Length: 306 ft (93 m)
- Beam: 36 ft 10 in (11.23 m)
- Draft: 13 ft 6 in (4.11 m)
- Propulsion: 2 × Combustion Engineering DR boilers; Turbo-electric drive with 2 × General Electric steam turbines; 2 × solid manganese-bronze 3600 lb. 3-bladed propellers, 8 ft 6 in (2.59 m), 7 ft 7 in (2.31 m) pitch; 12,000 hp (8.9 MW); 2 rudders; 359 tons fuel oil
- Speed: 23 knots (43 km/h; 26 mph)
- Range: 3,700 nmi (6,900 km) at 15 kn (28 km/h; 17 mph); 6,000 nmi (11,000 km) at 12 kn (22 km/h; 14 mph)
- Boats & landing craft carried: 4 × LCVPs
- Troops: 162 troops
- Complement: 204 (12 officers, 192 enlisted)
- Armament: 1 × 5"/38 caliber gun; 3 × twin 40 mm guns; 6 × single 20 mm guns; 2 × depth charge tracks

USS Carpellotti (APD-136) was a Crosley-class high speed transport in service with the United States Navy from 1945 to 1958. She was sold for scrap in 1966. Carpellotti was named after Marine Private First Class Louis J. Carpellotti (1918–1942), who was posthumously awarded the Silver Star for his actions on Tulagi, Solomon Islands, during the Battle of Guadalcanal.

== Namesake ==
Louis J. Carpellotti was born on 13 February 1918 in Old Forge, Pennsylvania. He enlisted in the United States Marine Corps on 22 September 1940. Private First Class Carpellotti was killed in action at Tulagi, Solomon Islands. During the Battle of Tulagi, part of the initial landings of Guadalcanal campaign, he led a detachment to deliver a flanking fire on a Japanese position, enabling the rest of his squad to assault and capture the position. Carpellotti was posthumously awarded the Silver Star and the Purple Heart.

The United States Navy destroyer escort USS Carpellotti was named for him, but its construction was cancelled in 1944 before it could be launched.

== History ==
Carpellotti, originally designated DE-720, a Rudderow-class destroyer escort, was re-designated as APD-136, a fast transport, on 17 July 1944, even before being laid down on 31 October 1944 at the Defoe Shipbuilding Company, in Bay City, Michigan. She was launched on 10 March 1945; sponsored by Mrs. S. Carpellotti. Builders trials before her pre-commissioning cruise were done in Lake Huron.

After completion, Carpellotti sailed from the builder's yard at Bay City to Chicago, Illinois. From there, she went through the Chicago Sanitary and Ship Canal and down the Chicago River to Joliet, Illinois, where pontoons were attached to the ship so it could be pushed down the Des Plaines River, Illinois River, and Mississippi River as part of a barge train. After arriving at the Todd Johnson Shipyard in Algiers, Louisiana, on the west bank of the Mississippi at New Orleans, the rest of the crew reported aboard, and Carpellotti was commissioned at New Orleans on 30 July 1945.

=== Service history ===
As it was completed too late for active participation in World War II, Carpellotti remained on active duty with the Atlantic Fleet, based in Norfolk, Virginia. Following a midshipman's cruise to English and French ports from 24 June through 2 August 1947, she was immobilized with a skeleton crew at Yorktown, Virginia, until 3 February 1948.

Resuming active service, Carpellotti operated from Norfolk on amphibious assault exercises along the United States East Coast and in the Caribbean. In the summer, she made midshipman cruises to European ports, and in 1948 made a good-will tour to the Persian Gulf. She also took part in North Atlantic Treaty Organization exercises: in 1952 in the first NATO amphibious "Operation Mainbrace"; and in 1955 and 1957 during her tours with the 6th Fleet in the Mediterranean.

=== Decommissioning and fate ===
Carpellotti was placed out of commission in reserve at Norfolk on 21 April 1958, and laid up in the Atlantic Reserve Fleet. Carpellotti was stricken from the Naval Vessel Registry on 1 December 1959. She was sold 20 June 1960, for $141,474 to Diamond Manufacturing Company of Savannah, Georgia, and used in the construction of the Norfolk-Portsmouth, Virginia bridge and tunnel project. In 1966, she was sold by Diamond Manufacturing to Boston Metals Company, Baltimore, Maryland, for scrapping.

== Awards ==
American Campaign Medal
World War II Victory Medal
National Defense Service Medal
