= Roger Drake =

Roger Drake may refer to:

- Roger Drake (colonial administrator), administrator of the English East India Company, President of Bengal, 1752–1756
- Roger Drake (physician) (1608–1669), English physician and Presbyterian minister
- Roger Drake, the founder and CEO of Drakes Supermarkets
