= James A. Drake (academic administrator) =

American academic administrator

James A. Drake is an American author and academic administrator. In March 2007, he was named president of Brevard Community College (now Eastern Florida State College), a public college with campuses in Palm Bay, Melbourne, Cocoa, and Titusville, Florida. With annual enrollments averaging nearly 30,000 students, the multi-campus institution was one of the 100 largest community colleges in the U.S. Prior to his retirement in 2012, Drake received national attention from CNN and other media outlets after donating a substantial portion of his first-year salary as president to fund textbook purchases for financially challenged students.

== Early life ==
He was born in Columbus, Ohio in 1944. While completing his doctoral studies, he accepted an offer to join the faculty of Ithaca College (Ithaca, NY). Drake earned a Ph.D. degree from Ohio State University in 1973. As a tenured professor and academic administrator at Ithaca College, he served as chair of the Department of Education, associate director of graduate studies, and director of televised studies. In the latter role, he worked with PBS station WNET/13 in New York City for the distribution of credit-earning television courses for teachers in New York State and New Jersey.

Drake served as an academic administrator with the University of Tampa, Clemson University (as executive director of the multi-institutional University Center, in Greenville, South Carolina), and the University of Central Florida. In 1987–88 he served as a full-time research consultant and equity partner with an Ohio-based management consulting firm, co-directing the higher-education division.

Drake is the author of seven books and more than fifty commercial and academic articles. Two of his biographies, Rosa Ponselle: A Singer’s Life, and Richard Tucker: A Biography, with forewords by tenor Luciano Pavarotti, were selected as “Books of the Month” by National Book Clubs of America. Fifteen years after Rosa Ponselle: A Singer's Life was published, Drake returned to her in Rosa Ponselle: A Centenary Biography (Amadeus Press), in which he employed a postmodern format to present and analyze conflicting accounts of Rosa Ponselle's life and career. His other books include Teaching Critical Thinking (1976), a textbook stemming from his doctoral research; Popular Culture and American Life (with M. W. Laforse, 1980); and Lily Pons: A Centennial Portrait (with K. B. Ludecke and a foreword by Beverly Sills, 1999).

Drake was a contributing author to American National Biography, as well as to The International Dictionary of Opera. He served on the editorial board of The Opera Quarterly, a vocal-music journal. His expertise in 19th and 20th century operatic performances led him to co-host with Don Martin (Jager) the radio series Voices That Live, originating from WHCU-FM, the CBS affiliate in Ithaca, N.Y. A syndicated version of the weekly radio show originating in South Carolina (with Charles Koelsch as co-host) aired from 1989-1994.

== Personal life ==
Drake lives in Merritt Island, Florida, where he and his late wife, Magali Garriga Drake (1939-2025), were married in 1995.
