= Governor Drake =

Governor Drake may refer to:

- Dawsonne Drake (1724–1784), Governor of Manila from 1762 to 1764, Governor of White Town from 1742 to 1762
- Francis M. Drake (1830–1903), Governor of Iowa from 1896 to 1898
- Francis William Drake (1724–1788/89), Governor of Newfoundland from 1750 to 1752
