= Edward Drake =

Edward Drake may refer to:

- Edward Drake (cricketer) (1832–1904), English clergyman and cricketer
- Edward Drake (skier) (born 1986), British alpine skier and ski cross racer
- Edward John Drake, director based in Los Angeles, California
- Edward Joseph Drake (1912–1995), English football player, better known as Ted Drake
