= Cyril Drake =

English cricketer

Personal information
- Full name: Cyril Henry Drake
- Born: 9 January 1922; Leicester, Leicestershire, England
- Died: 5 February 1992 (aged 70); Glenfield, Leicestershire, England
- Batting: Right-handed
- Bowling: Right-arm fast

Domestic team information
- Years: Team
- 1939: Leicestershire

Career statistics
| Competition | First-class |
|---|---|
| Matches | 8 |
| Runs scored | 43 |
| Batting average | 5.37 |
| 100s/50s | –/– |
| Top score | 13 |
| Balls bowled | 1,428 |
| Wickets | 19 |
| Bowling average | 31.84 |
| 5 wickets in innings | 1 |
| 10 wickets in match | – |
| Best bowling | 5/21 |
| Catches/stumpings | 3/– |
- Source: Cricinfo, 29 June 2012

Cyril Henry Drake (9 January 1922 – 5 February 1992) was an English cricketer. Drake was a right-handed batsman who bowled right-arm fast. He was born at Leicester, Leicestershire.

Drake made his first-class debut for Leicestershire against Cambridge University at Fenner's in 1939. He made seven further first-class appearances for the county in 1939, with his final first-class appearance coming against Derbyshire at Aylestone Road, Leicester. In his eight first-class matches, he took a total of 19 wickets at an average of 31.84, with best figures of 5/21. These figures were his only five wicket haul and came against Warwickshire at Edgbaston. With the bat, he scored 43 runs at a batting average of 5.37, with a high score of 13.

He died at Glenfield, Leicestershire, on 5 February 1992.
