= Chris Drake (disambiguation) =

Chris or Christopher Drake may refer to:

- Chris Drake (1923–2006), American actor
- Christopher Drake, American film and television composer
- Chris Drake (tennis), former American professional tennis player
- Chris Drake (The Only Way Is Essex), reality television personality
- Chris Drake (peace activist), former member of the Greenham Common Women's Peace Camp
