= Oliver Drake =

Oliver Drake may refer to:

- Oliver Drake (filmmaker) (1903–1991), American screenwriter and director of Western movies
- Oliver Drake (baseball) (born 1987), American baseball player
