= James Drake (visual artist) =

American visual artist

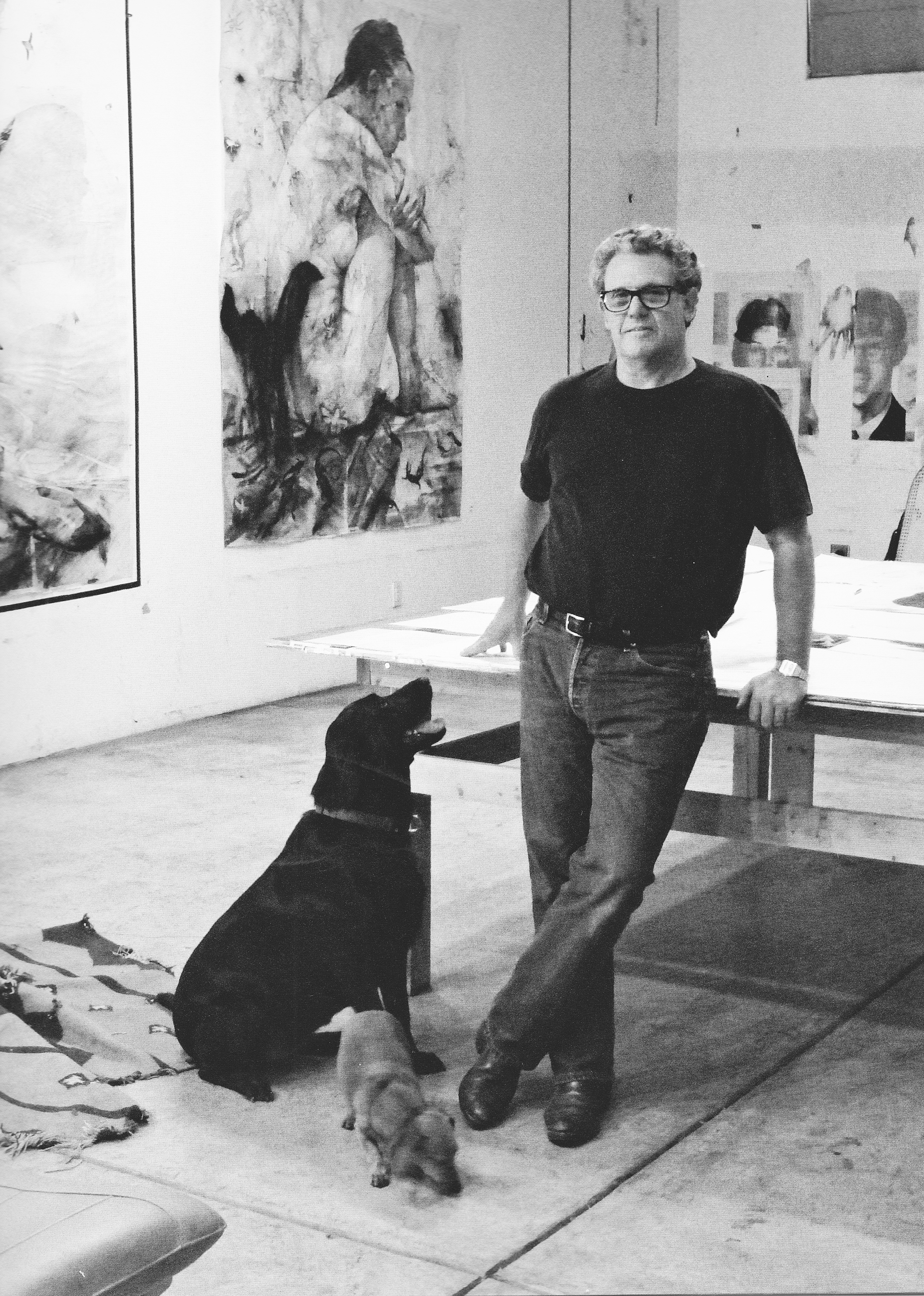
- James Drake in the studio, Santa Fe, NM
- Born: 1946; Lubbock, Texas
- Education: Art Center College of Design
- Known for: Interdisciplinary visual arts
- Awards: John Simon Guggenheim Memorial Foundation Fellowship, 2001. Nancy Graves Award for Visual Arts, 2001. National Endowment for the Arts Grant, !988 and 1989.
- Website: https://jamesdrakeart.com/

James Drake (born 1946) is an American interdisciplinary and visual artist known for his works across various mediums such as drawing, video, sculpture, photography, printmaking, and installations. Based in Santa Fe, New Mexico, his work examines themes related to the human condition, communication systems, and socio-political issues.

Some of his works include the video installation "Tongue-Cut Sparrows" (1999), which explores issues of language, power, and cultural identity, and the drawing series The Anatomy of Drawing and Space (Brain Trash) (2014), a 1,242-panel exploration of human thought and experience. His work has been featured in exhibitions at institutions such as the Museum of Contemporary Art San Diego, the New Mexico Museum of Art, the Venice Biennale, and the Whitney Biennial. Drake has received several awards, including Guggenheim Fellowship and National Endowment for the Arts Grants.

== Biography ==
James Drake is an interdisciplinary artist currently living and working in Santa Fe, New Mexico. He was born in Lubbock, Texas (1946) and earned a Masters of Fine Arts degree (1970) from the Art Center College of Design, in Los Angeles, where he studied with his mentor Lorser Feitelson. His drawings, video, sculpture, photography, printmaking and installations, investigate the human condition, emotions, and systems of communication, oftentimes through allegory to underscore the cyclical nature of history. During his time living in El Paso, Texas, issues related to the USA/Mexico border became a central theme in his body of work and the broader universal context he explores. The subject matter of Drake's artwork situates geo-political and social histories, as endlessly repeating narratives. Temporal-spatial relations are crucial to his art. The crossing, the transition, that most gives his work its power is that which cuts apart, yet links, the declared and the concealed, the public and the personal.

== Seminal Works ==
=== Tongue-Cut Sparrows (1996–2007) ===
Tongue-Cut Sparrows was inspired by a system of sign language Drake observed women standing outside a jail in El Paso, Texas, used to communicate with prisoners on the inside. Fascinated by this inventive form of gestural communication, Drake became curious if the women could integrate quotes from literature and poetry into their sign language. They agreed to let Drake record their visits on video and worked with him in selecting texts to sign from the writings of Spanish poet Federico García Lorca, Chicano-Apache American poet Jimmy Santiago Baca, Cormac McCarthy, as well as William Blake, William Shakespeare and Alighieri Dante. The series evolved into multi-channel video works, photographs, printmaking and large-scale charcoal drawings. In the photo-realistic drawings, images of the figures are joined by some of the words that were communicated between the couples. Often, there is a breakdown, or strain, in the communication—a tension that is emblematic of Drake's ongoing interest in the social dynamics of borderlands.

=== City of Tells (2002-2021) ===
City of Tells is a series composed of drawings, split-screen video and an artist book. The work incorporates depictions of animals, portraits of family, friends, and diverse historical and contemporary influences such as Diego Rivera, Dante, Bruce Nauman, Murray Gell-Mann, La Malinche, Delacroix, Homer, Michelangelo, Herman Melville, and Goya. In gambling parlance, a "tell" is the subconscious broadcasting of one's emotional, psychological, and intellectual make-up. In the large-scale Renaissance tableau inspired drawing, Drake uses the motif of the banquet table to reference biblical tales and cultural mythology. "City of Tells" addresses a collective Western history and the interconnectedness of animal and human life. "Drake looks for the ‘tell,’ the sign that reveals the truth in his subjects and in him. The City of Tells addresses his concerns of the self-consciousness of culture and appetite of instinct."

=== The Anatomy of Drawing and Space / Brain Trash (2011-2014) ===
Over the course of three years Drake maintained a commitment to draw each day without pre-conceived content or form in mind. This daily discipline led to a stream of consciousness process, in which the completion of one drawing, prompted the creation of another. The body of work evolved into ten chapters of 1,242 drawings, each numbered in a chronological sequence to denote his daily ritual of mark making. The project culminated in a touring exhibition opening at The Museum of Contemporary Art San Diego in 2014 and a publication by Radius Books. The monumental scale of the installed work "maps a space of humanity toggling between the languages of physics and poetry, illustrated by images of current events and cultural history."

=== Can We Know the Sound of Forgiveness (2014-ongoing) ===
This ongoing body of work explores themes of social complexities surrounding intersections between chaos, desperation, and forgiveness. The work grapples with some of the daunting, complicated questions facing a divided humanity. In 2022 the project matured into a collaborative performance that brings together Drake's visuals with artists from a number of different disciplines including writer Benjamin Sáenz, Mexican composer Gabriela Ortiz, New York performance artist Shaun Leonardo and Mexican multidisciplinary artist and flutist Alejandro Escuer.

== Exhibitions ==
Drake has had solo museum exhibitions at Site Santa Fe, Santa Fe, N.M.; New Mexico Museum of Art, Santa Fe; Museum of Contemporary Art, Houston, Texas; Corcoran Gallery of Art, Washington, D.C. and the Museum of Contemporary Art San Diego, La Jolla, CA. Group exhibitions include the 52nd International Art Exhibition, Venice Biennale, Venice, Italy; the Whitney Biennial 2000, New York, N.Y.;The National Museum of American Art and Smithsonian Institution, Washington, D.C.

== Collections ==
Drake's work is held in the permanent collections of: Albright-Knox Art Gallery, Blanton Museum of Art, Brooklyn Museum, Corcoran Gallery of Art, Dallas Museum of Art, Denver Museum of Art, Museum of Fine Arts, Houston, New Orleans Museum of Art, New Mexico Museum of Art, National Gallery of Art, Smithsonian American Art Museum, Museum of Contemporary Art San Diego and the Whitney Museum of American Art. In 1992 Drake was commissioned by the city of Birmingham, Alabama, to create 3 public art monuments for the Freedom Walk in Kelly Ingram Park, where many civil rights demonstrations occurred in 1963, igniting racial unrest when police responded to a non-violent protest with brutality and arrests.

== Awards and recognition ==
In 2001 Drake received a John Simon Guggenheim Memorial Foundation Fellowship and a Nancy Graves Award for Visual Arts. In 1989 he received the Awards in the Visual Arts Fellowship from the Southeast Center for Contemporary Art, and two National Endowment for the Arts Grants.
