= John Drake (cricketer) =

English cricketer

John Drake (1 September 1893 – 22 May 1967) was an English first-class cricketer, who played three matches for Yorkshire County Cricket Club in 1923 and 1924, when he also turned out for their Second XI.

Born in Tong Park, Baildon, Yorkshire, England, he met with little success in outings for his native county. A right arm fast medium bowler, he took one wicket for 117, and scored 21 runs at an average of 7.00, with a best score of 10. He also took two catches.

He died in Meanwood, Yorkshire in May 1967.
