= Tony Drake =

Tony Drake may refer to:

- Tony Drake (hiker) (1923–2012), British hiker and rambler
- Tony Drake (wrestler) (born 1978), American wrestler using the ring name Babi Slymm
