= Bob Drake =

Robert, Bob or Bobby Drake may refer to:

- Bob Drake (musician) (born 1957), musician and recording engineer
- Bobby Drake, drummer for the American rock band The Hold Steady
- Bob Drake (racing driver) (1919–1990), American racing driver
- Iceman (Marvel Comics), alias Robert "Bobby" Drake, Marvel Comics character
- Robert E. Drake (1923–2006), American intelligence official
- Robert Drake (editor) (born 1962 or 1963), gay American author and editor
- Robert Drake (MP) for Marlborough
- Robert Drake (martyr) (died 1556), burned at the stake for his Protestant faith
