= Grae Drake =

American entertainment journalist, host and film critic

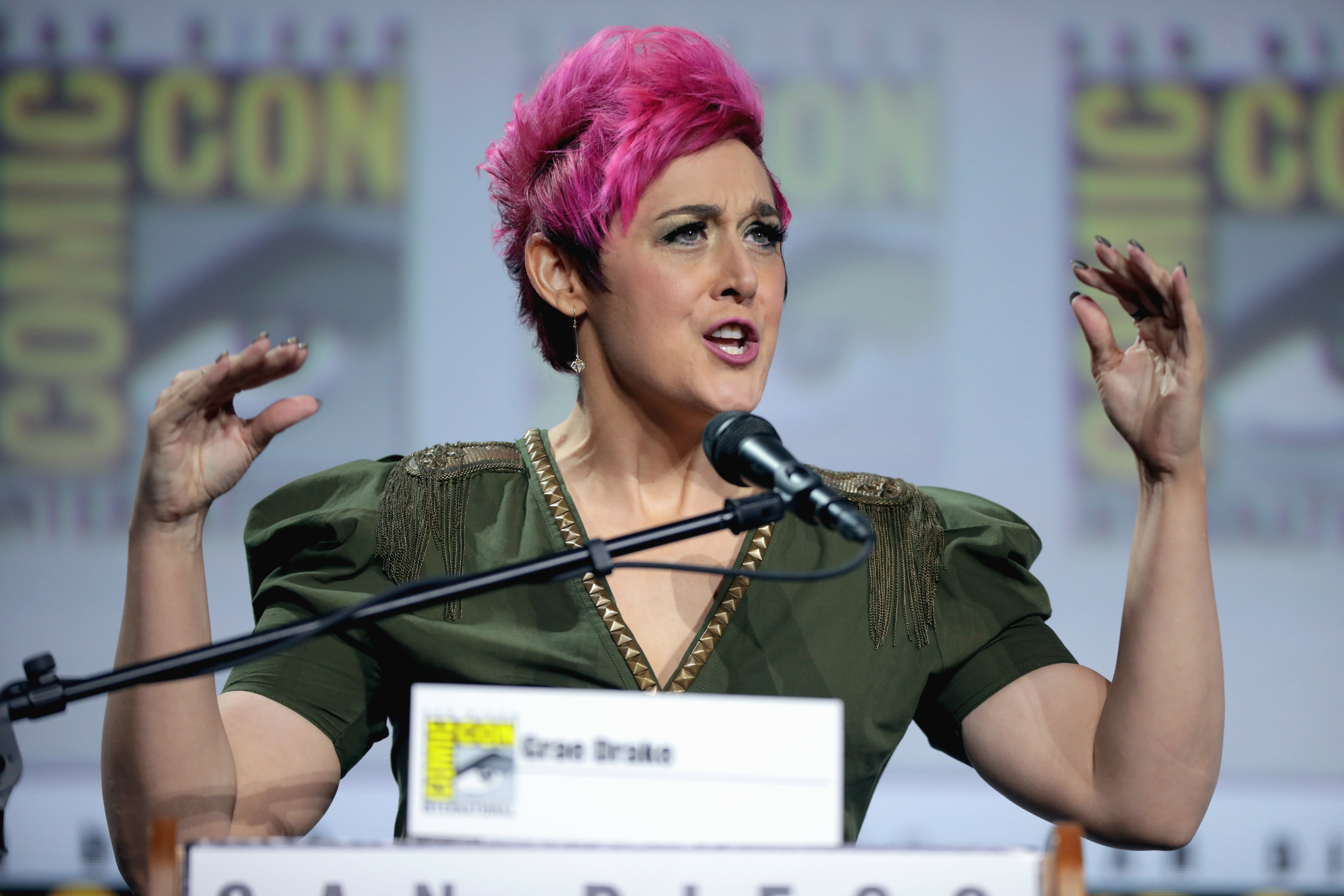
- Grae Drake speaking at the 2019 San Diego Comic-Con, for "Terminator: Dark Fate"
- Born: Colorado, United States
- Education: University of Texas at Austin
- Occupations: Host, Presenter, Film Critic, Reporter, Geek Personality
- Years active: 2004–present
- Spouse: Steve Gelder
- Website: http://www.graedrake.com

Grae Drake is an American host, entertainment journalist, and film critic.

Drake is best known for her work as a film critic and her celebrity interviews.

Drake is a recognized "geek culture" personality in fandom circles, and often serves as a panelist, moderator and panel host at major pop culture conventions and events nationwide including New York Comic Con, WonderCon, SXSW, and San Diego Comic-Con.

She is uniquely notable for her approach to celebrity interviews, where her use of costumes, props, and comedy serve to both disarm and engage her celebrity guests in unexpected ways.

== Early years ==
Prior to her journalism career, Drake worked in many facets of the entertainment industry. She has previously worked behind the camera for ABC, Oceangate Productions, Motion Theory and Prometheus Productions.

Drake has also produced, appeared in, and is credited for video editing work on a variety of projects for film and television, including Extreme Makeover: Home Edition, Ancient Aliens, and How to Look Good Naked with Carson Kressley.

Drake became well known in the "geek community" and coupled with her work in the entertainment industry led to a successful self-start in podcasting. In 2004, she founded and hosted a weekly movie podcast called The Popcorn Mafia that ran for over 8 years, and included such notable guests as Diablo Cody, Ahmed Best, and James Marsden. The weekly podcast produced at least two shows that were recorded in front of a live audience. The Andy Dick episode was recorded at the Silent Movie Theater in West Hollywood CA, and the Diablo Cody episode was recorded at the New Beverly Cinema in Los Angeles, California.

== Journalism career ==
Drake is a member of Broadcast Film Critics and is a participant in the Critics' Choice Movie Awards.

Drake was the Senior Movie Editor for Rotten Tomatoes, and co-hosts their Sirius Radio program. Drake continues to work as a film critic for Fandango, Movies.com and provides movie review segments and reports on entertainment industry events on CNN.

In contrast to her work as a serious film critic and journalist, Drake's approach to celebrity interviews are notorious in fandom circles for being comedic, irreverent and entertaining in their own right. Many are re-broadcast in part or whole as segments on mainstream television news programs, talk shows, and entertainment websites.

Drake is notably one of the first legitimate film critics who began using, and continues to use the internet as a medium for entertainment journalism. Drake has spoken to this new paradigm and the changes in the media landscape as a panelist for Comic Con International's "Masters of the Web" in 2012, 2013 and 2015, with peers including John Campea, Ryan Turek, Evan Dickson, James Oster, Heather Wixson, Lawrence Raffel, Adam Wingard and Simon Barrett.

Drake is a frequent guest on assorted television programmes and web streams including Good Day L.A., CNN, and Fox News where she provides current news topical to the entertainment industry and popular culture in general.

In March 2019, Drake was selected to become the leading brand personality for Moviefone. Under the moniker "Ms. Moviefone", Drake will be responsible for interviews with celebrities and film industry professionals, oversee existing video content, and host new video content for the Moviefone brand.

In January 2025, Drake joined Comic Book Resources as senior producer and lead host. Jon Arvedon, managing editor of CBR, said, "I'm extremely excited to have Grae joining us at CBR. Her experience in the entertainment landscape speaks for itself, and it's perfectly aligned with CBR's mission to deliver content that's both expert-driven and entertaining. I'm greatly looking forward to seeing the impact she'll make!"
