= Joseph Drake =

Joseph or Joe Drake may refer to:

- Joseph Rodman Drake (1795–1820), American poet
- Joseph Drake (soldier) (1806–1878), Confederate Army colonel
- Joseph Morley Drake (1828–1886), doctor and educator
- Joe Drake (American football) (1963–1994), American football player
- Joe Drake (producer), film producer
