= John Drake (1657–1716) =

English politician (1657–1716)

John Drake (1657 – c. 15 December 1716) was an English politician who sat for various times as MP for Amersham from 1699 till 1713.

He was baptised in April 1657. He was the fifth son of Francis Drake, the third son by his third wife Susanna Potts. He was the half-brother of Sir William Drake. He was educated at St. John's College, Oxford and matriculated in 1675. In 1677, he entered the Middle Temple. He married Anne who died after 1728.
