= Paul Drake (disambiguation) =

Paul Drake is a fictional private detective in the Perry Mason novels and TV series.

Paul Drake may also refer to:

- Paul Drake (actor), American actor in the 1983 film Sudden Impact
- Paul Drake, suspect in the kidnapping of Shannon Matthews
