= David Drake (chef) =

American chef

David Drake is a chef in New Jersey. He has worked at the Stage House Inn in Scotch Plains, New Jersey, established the restaurant David Drake with business partner Jim Kennedy in Rahway, New Jersey, and was executive chef at the Daryl Wine Bar in New Brunswick, New Jersey until 2009.

In 2010 he helped revamp Alice's Restaurant on Lake Hopatcong.

== Early life ==
Drake was born in Summit, New Jersey.

He started out at 17 as a dishwasher at Chez Odette in New Hope, Pennsylvania.

== Career ==
Drake became executive chef at the Frog and the Peach in New Brunswick. He also worked with chef Jean Francois Taquet, at the River Café with chef David Burke in Brooklyn, and at the Ryland Inn with chef Craig Shelton in Whitehouse.

Credited as a "New Jersey pioneer of modern American cuisine with classic French roots," Drake had growing success until the rough patch in the economy took a toll on business starting in 2007. In 2010 he helped revamp Alice's Restaurant on Lake Hopatcong.
