= Nathan Drake (disambiguation) =

Nathan Drake is the protagonist of the Uncharted video game series.

Nathan Drake may also refer to:

- Nathan Drake (artist) (c. 1728–1778), English artist
- Nathan Drake (essayist) (1766–1836), his son, English Shakespearian essayist and physician

== See also ==
- Nathaniel Drake House
