= Samuel Drake (divine) =

Church of England clergyman (1622–1679)

The Reverend Samuel Drake
- Prebendary of Southwell
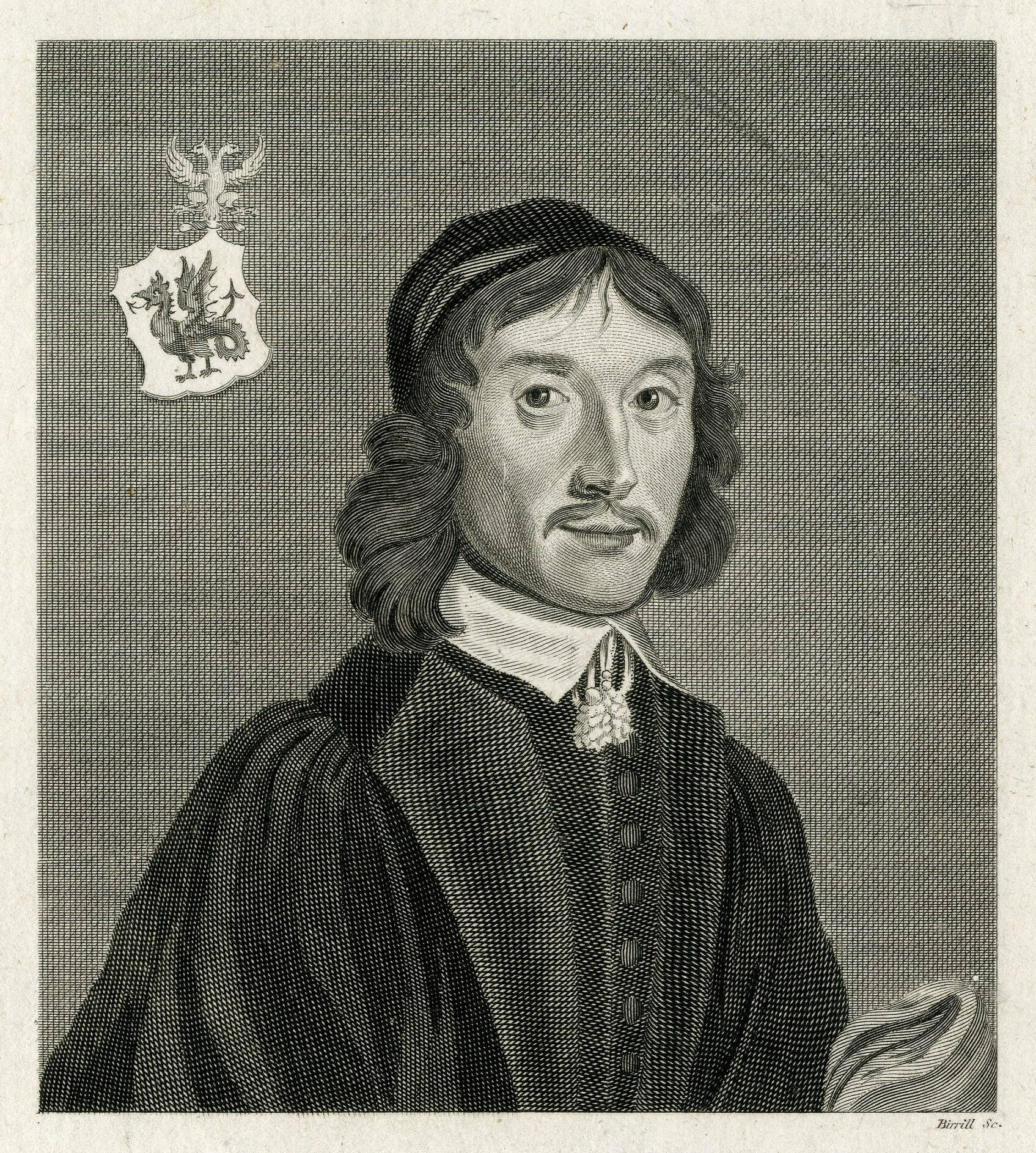
- Line engraving by Andrew Birrell after an unknown artist, published 1807

Personal details
- Born: Pontefract, West Riding of Yorkshire
- Baptised: 29 September 1622
- Died: 1679 (aged ~56)
- Denomination: Anglican

Samuel Drake (bapt. 1622 – 1679) was an English Royalist divine. He was fellow of St. John's College, Cambridge, 1643, and M.A., 1644, but was ejected from his fellowship for refusing to take the Covenant. He fought at Newark; was incumbent of Pontefract, 1660; D.D., 1661; and prebendary of Southwell, 1670–1.

== Life ==
Samuel Drake was born in Pontefract, although some old sources say he was a native of Halifax, Yorkshire. He was baptised in Pontefract on 29 September 1622, the first of the three children of Nathan Drake (1587–1658) of Halifax and Elizabeth Higgins (died 1672). He was educated at Pocklington School. He was admitted to St. John's College, Cambridge, in 1637, and obtained his B.A. degree in 1640–1. In 1643 he was admitted a fellow of that college by royal command, and in the following year proceeded M.A. He was subsequently ejected from his fellowship for refusing to take the Covenant. He afterwards joined the Royalist army, and was a member of the garrison at Pontefract, and present at the Battle of Newark. In 1651 the Parliament ordered him and several other ministers to be tried by the High Court of Justice on suspicion of conspiracy, but the result is unknown. At the Restoration he was presented to the living of Pontefract, and in 1661 he petitioned the King to intercede with the vice-chancellor of Cambridge University that he might proceed to the degree of B.D., as he had not been able to keep his name on the college books, and sent certificates to show that he had served with the army, and that his father's estate had been plundered. In November 1661 Charles II complied with his request, and in a letter of Williamson Drake says the vice-chancellor permitted him to proceed D.D. after "long bickerings". In 1670 he was collated to a prebend of Southwell, which he resigned the following year. He died in 1679, although some old sources give the earlier date of 1673. He left a son, Francis Drake, vicar of Pontefract, who assisted Walker in the compilation of The Sufferings of the Clergy, and whose sons, Samuel and Francis, were separately notable.

== Works ==
Drake wrote:

1. A Sermon on Micah vi. 8, 1670.
2. A Sermon on Romans xiii. 6, 1670.
3. Concio ad Clerum, published 1719.

== Sources ==
- Baker, Thomas (1869). History of the College of St. John the Evangelist, Cambridge. Part 1. Cambridge: The University Press. p. 535.
- Poole, H. H. (2008). "Drake, Samuel (bap. 1622, d. 1679), Church of England clergyman". Oxford Dictionary of National Biography. Oxford University Press. Retrieved 8 September 2022.

Attribution:

- This article incorporates text from a publication now in the public domain: Bickley, Augustus Charles (1888). "Drake, Samuel (d.1673)". In Stephen, Leslie (ed.). Dictionary of National Biography. Vol. 15. London: Smith, Elder & Co. pp. 449–450.
