= USS Carpellotti (DE-548) =

History

United States
- Name: USS Carpellotti
- Namesake: Private First Class Louis J. Carpellotti (1918-1942), a U.S. Marine Corps Silver Star recipient
- Builder: Boston Navy Yard, Boston, Massachusetts (proposed)
- Launched: Never
- Fate: Construction contract cancelled 1944

General characteristics
- Class & type: John C. Butler-class destroyer escort
- Displacement: 1,350 tons
- Length: 306 ft (93 m)
- Beam: 36 ft 8 in (11 m)
- Draft: 9 ft 5 in (3 m)
- Propulsion: 2 boilers, 2 geared turbine engines, 12,000 shp; 2 propellers
- Speed: 24 knots (44 km/h)
- Range: 6,000 nmi. (12,000 km) @ 12 kt
- Complement: 14 officers, 201 enlisted
- Armament: 2 × single 5 in (127 mm) guns; 2 × twin 40 mm (1.6 in) AA guns; 10 × single 20 mm (0.79 in) AA guns; 1 × triple 21 in (533 mm) torpedo tubes; 8 × depth charge throwers; 1 × Hedgehog ASW mortar; 2 × depth charge racks

USS Carpellotti (DE-548) was a proposed World War II United States Navy John C. Butler-class destroyer escort that was never completed.

Plans called for Carpellotti to be built at the Boston Navy Yard in Boston, Massachusetts. The contract for her construction was cancelled in 1944 before she could be launched.

The name Carpellotti was reassigned to the destroyer escort USS Carpellotti (DE-720), which was converted during construction into the fast transport USS Carpellotti (APD-136).
