= Hannah Drake =

American poet and activist

Hannah L. Drake
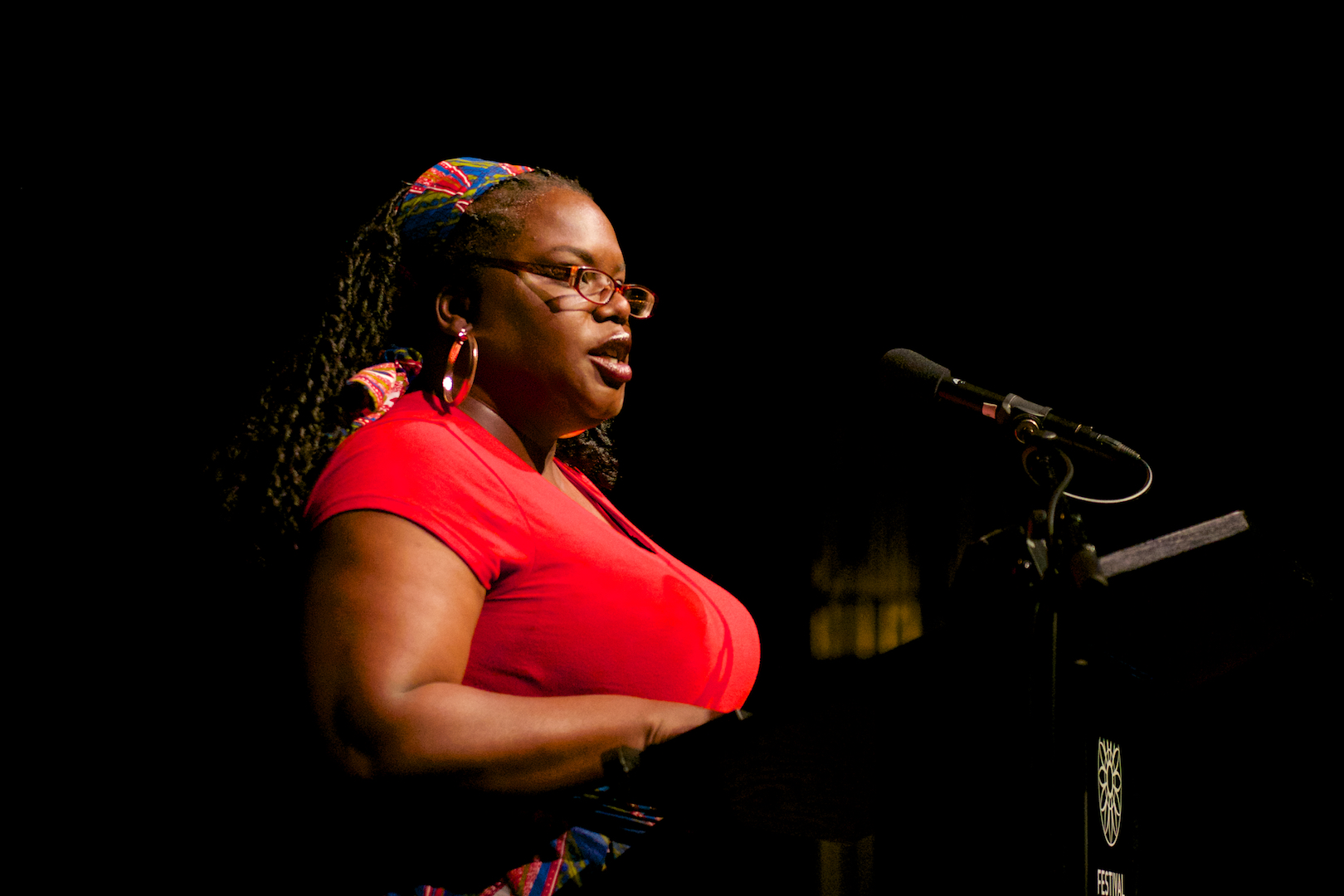
- Drake in 2017
- Occupations: Writer, activist and public speaker
- Notable work: "All You Had To Do Was Play The Game, Boy"
- Awards: Muhammad Ali Center's 2019 Daughter of Greatness

Hannah Drake is an American poet, blogger, activist, public speaker, and author of 11 books.

On Super Bowl Sunday of 2019 (February 3, 2019), Drake garnered a lot of attention when film director and producer Ava DuVernay tweeted out a video of Drake's poem "All You Had to Do Was Play the Game, Boy". DuVernay's tweet was meant to protest the NFL's treatment of former football quarterback and civil rights activist Colin Kaepernick. Kaepernick in turn shared the poem with his followers, and Drake's video reached 2.4 million viewers.

In February 2019, Drake was selected by the Muhammad Ali Center to be a Daughter of Greatness. The Daughter of Greatness Breakfast Series features prominent women engaged in social philanthropy, activism, and pursuits of justice to share their stories with the Louisville community.

Drake is the chief creative officer of IDEAS xLab, an artist-run nonprofit based in Louisville, Kentucky. In 2021, The New York Times recognized her work on the (Un)Known Project, a multimedia installation artwork meant to recognize all the Black people who were enslaved in Kentucky and elsewhere.

Recently, Drake was selected as one of the Best of the Best in Louisville, Kentucky, for her poem “Spaces".

== Bibliography ==
=== Books ===
Year	Title	Publisher	ISBN	Notes
2019	Dear White Women, It's Not You. It's Me. I'm Breaking Up With You!: Commentaries on Race, White Feminism, Allyship and Intersectionality	Drake Publishing	ISBN 9780997299229	Nonfiction
2019	Love, Revolution, & Lemonade: Poetry, Prose, & Passion	Drake Publishing	ISBN 9780997299212	Nonfiction
2018	Dear America, I'm Still Rooting For You	Drake Publishing	ISBN 9780997299205	Commentary
2015	For Such A Time As This	CreateSpace Independent Publishing Platform	ISBN 9781512265941	Poetry collection
2014	So Many Things I Want To Tell You...: Life Lessons for the Journey	CreateSpace Independent Publishing Platform	ISBN 9781497324893	Commentary
2013	Fragile Destiny		ISBN 1450529933	Novel
2013	Views From the Back Pew		ISBN 1450562906	Novel
2010	An...ti...ci...pa...tion	CreateSpace Independent Publishing Platform	ISBN 9781453711002	Poetry collection
2010	Hannah's Plea: Poetry for the Soul	CreateSpace Independent Publishing Platform	ISBN 9781451577273	Poetry collection
2010	Life Lived In Color	CreateSpace Independent Publishing Platform	ISBN 9781453703991	Poetry collection
2007	In Spite of My Chains: Poems From A Liberated Mind	CreateSpace Independent Publishing Platform	ISBN 9781451596199	Poetry collection
