= Thomas Drake =

Thomas Drake may refer to:

- Thomas A. Drake (born 1957), NSA whistleblower
- Thomas J. Drake (1797–1875), American politician from Michigan
- Thomas Y. Drake (1936–2008), Canadian folk singer

== See also ==
- Tom Drake (1918–1982), American actor born Alfred Sinclair Alderdice
- Tom Drake (baseball) (1912–1988), American baseball pitcher
- Tom Drake (wrestler) (1930–2017), American former professional wrestler, attorney, and politician
- Tom Drake-Brockman (1919–1992), Australian politician
- Sir Thomas Trayton Fuller-Eliott-Drake, 1st Baronet, British Army officer
