= Ken Drake (photographer) =

British-born Australian photographer

- Website: http://www.zoostudio.com.au/

Ken Drake (b. United Kingdom, 1970) is a British-born Australian photographer and author who specializes in animal portraits.

Drake photographs about 1300 animals each year for clients and charities in Australia. Drake operates a portrait photography business, Zoo Studio, in Brisbane.

Drake is the author of the book Tail Tales and was a major photographic contributor to Oscars Law's 2012 book I Want Oscar Law because. Drake has won over 65 professional photography awards since 2008.

== Education and work ==
Drake originally worked in information technology at British Telecom and Micromuse in London. In 2006 he emigrated to Perth, Western Australia where he founded Zoo Studio. He relocated to Brisbane, Queensland in 2009. Drake has no formal education in photography.

Drake's work has been featured in magazines, books, radio show, and on national TV. He was made an Associate of the Australian Institute of Professional Photography in 2011.

Some of Drake's photographs were Finalist images in Creative Asia 2010 and 2012. One of Drake's photographs won the International Faces competition held by Photographic District News in 2011 and he entered many Finalist images in the International Loupe Awards 2011, 2012 and 2013

In 2012 Drake's photograph entitled "Dale – abused Shar Pei" won first prize for animal photography at the International Photography Awards, a silver medal at the Australian Professional Photography Awards and a silver medal at the International Aperture Awards.

In 2013 Drake won a gold medal at the Australian Photography Awards.

In 2014 Drake created a series of photos of an abandoned baby koala and auctioned them to raise money for the animal's care. Also in 2014 he was awarded the Grand Prize at the Wedding and Portrait Photographers International Awards in Los Angeles.

== Book – Tail Tales ==
Drake's first book, Tail Tales (2013), is a photographic exploration of pets lives in Australia in 2013. It contains portraits pets in a studio setting. Book sales raised over $23,000 for RSPCA Queensland. The book included many RSPCA rescued animals.

== Awards and nominations ==
All Drake's awards have been won with his commissioned animal portraits.

=== 2010 ===
- International Aperture Awards – 3 Silvers and Top Finalist, 4 Bronzes
- Queensland Professional Photography Awards – 1 Silver Distinction, 2 Silver Awards
- Australian Professional Photography Awards, 1 Silver Award

=== 2011 ===
- International Photo District News Faces Portrait Competition – Grand Winner
- International Photo District News Faces Portrait Competition –Winner, Animal Portrait Category
- Australian Professional Photography Awards – 1 Silver Distinction Award, 2 Silver Awards
- International Loupe Awards – 2 Silver Awards, 4 Bronze Awards, 1 image Top 50 Finals
- Creative Asia International Photography Awards – 1 Silver, 4 Bronze, 1 image Top Finalist

=== 2012 ===
- International Photography Awards – Winner 1st Place Pets and 5 Honourable Mentions
- International Loupe Awards – 4 Silver Awards, 2 Bronze Awards, including 3 images in top 50 Finals
- Creative Asia International Photography Awards – 9 Silver Awards and 5 images in top 25 Finals
- Australian Professional Photography Awards – 3 Silver Awards
- Queensland Professional Photography Awards – 3 Silver Medals
- The Edge Imaging Photography Excellence Awards – Winner
- Winner Specialist Retailer – Westside Newspapers Business Achiever Awards 2012

=== 2013 ===
- Queensland Professional Photography Awards – 3 Silver Awards
