= Jack Drake (disambiguation) =

Jack Drake is a fictional character in Batman.

Jack Drake is also the name of:

- Russell Jackson "Jack" Drake (born 1945), American civil rights lawyer
- Jack Drake (politician) (1934–2015), Iowa State Representative
- Jack Drake (footballer) (1904–1941), Australian rules footballer

== See also ==
- John Drake (disambiguation)
