= Gayla Drake =

American guitarist and singer/songwriter

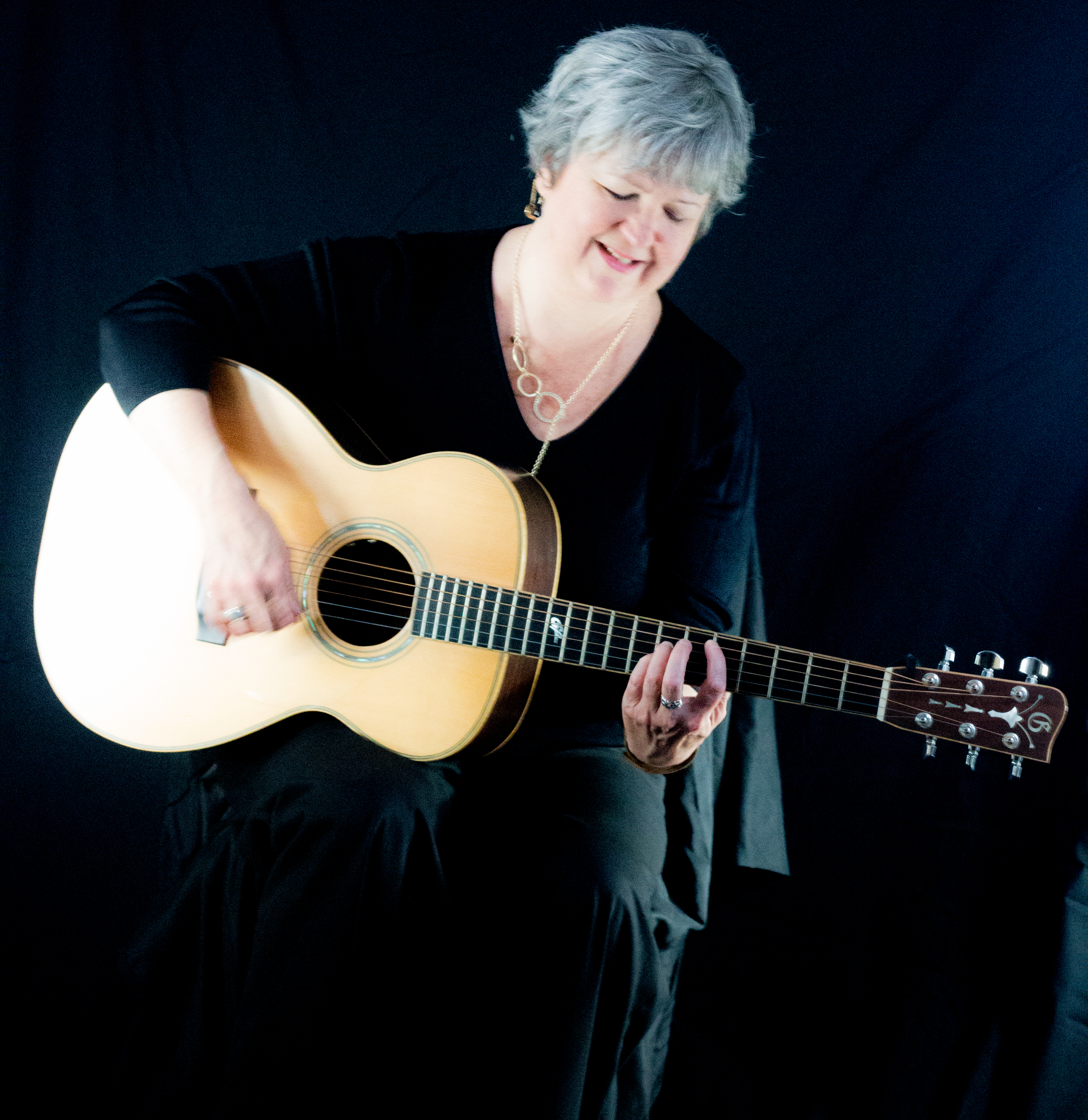

Background information
- Born: December 3, 1964 (age 61); Iowa, United States
- Instrument: Guitar

Gayla Drake (born December 3, 1964, in Iowa) is an American guitarist and singer/songwriter.

== Biography ==
Drake was born in Iowa on December 3, 1964. She began playing the guitar at the age of 4 and performed Old-time music, Bluegrass music, and Celtic music throughout her formative years, finally recording her first CD of original music in 1994. She has released 14 additional recordings since that time, along with music for public television and independent films. She was interim managing editor of Premier Guitar Magazine for several months in 2009.

== Discography ==
- 1995 – Gayla Drake Paul
- 1995 – Waiting for the Spark
- 1997 – How Can I Keep From Singing?
- 1999 – A Woman’s Touch
- 2005 – The Time Between Times
- 2000 – The Next Hill
- 2002 – Retrospective
- 2005 – Restless
- 2005 – I Know This Road
- 2005 – Broken Blues
- 2005 – The Joy Tree
- 2006 – Here in the Center of the World with Eric Douglas
- 2006 – Ethik: Blues and Mud Flowers
- 2007 – The Wheel
- 2008 – Pour Me
