= Nick Drake (disambiguation) =

Nick Drake (1948–1974) was a British singer-songwriter.

Nick Drake may also refer to:

== People ==
- Nick Drake (poet) (born 1961), British poet
- Nick Drake (racing driver) (born 1995), American stock car racing driver

== See also ==
- Nick Drake-Lee (1942–2021), English rugby union footballer
- Nick Drake (album), an album by Nick Drake
