= Charles Bryant Drake =

United States Army general

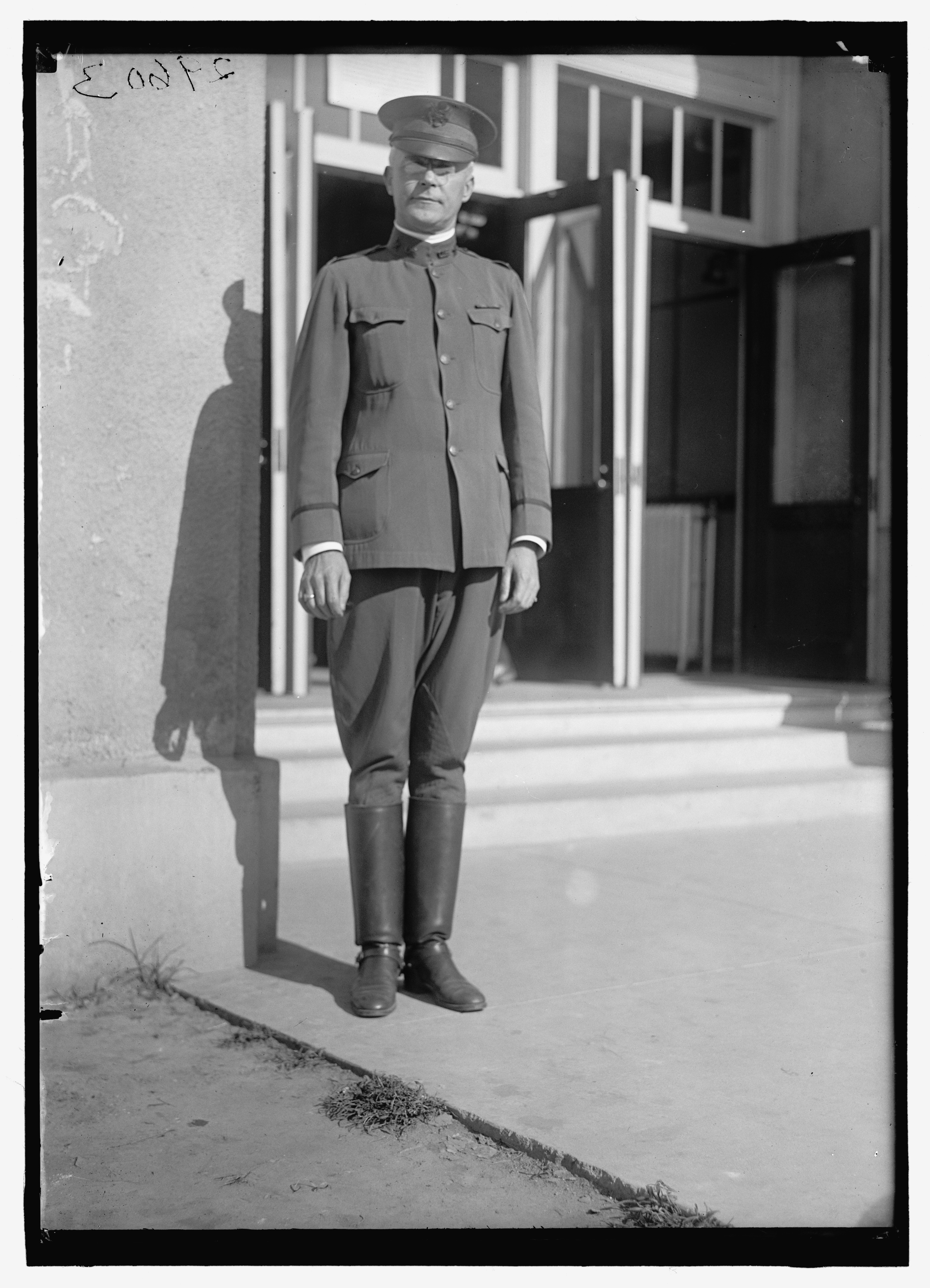
- Born: September 14, 1872; Old Forge, Lackawanna County, Pennsylvania, United States
- Died: August 14, 1956 (aged 83); Rehoboth Beach, Delaware, United States
- Burial place: Arlington National Cemetery, Virginia, United States
- Spouse: Hilda E. Jacobs
- Military career
- Allegiance: United States
- Branch: United States Army
- Service years: 1896–1922
- Rank: Brigadier General
- Service number: 0-507
- Unit: Cavalry Branch
- Conflicts: Philippine–American War; Pancho Villa Expedition
- Awards: Distinguished Service Cross; Army Distinguished Service Medal; Silver Star (2)

Charles Bryant Drake (September 14, 1872 – August 14, 1956) was a United States Army officer in the late 19th and early 20th centuries.

== Biography ==
Drake was born in Old Forge, Lackawanna County, Pennsylvania, on September 14, 1872, to a family that had resided in the country since before the American Revolutionary War. After graduating from Wyoming Seminary, Drake won a competitive examination and entered the United States Military Academy in 1892, graduating in 1896.

Drake was commissioned in the Fifth Cavalry at Fort Sam Houston, and he later served at Fort McIntosh, Texas, Fort Brown, and in Huntsville, Alabama. After sailing to Bayamón, Puerto Rico, with his unit in January 1899, Drake was promoted to first lieutenant and stationed in Fort Yates, North Dakota, and Fort Yellowstone with the First Cavalry. Upon his promotion to the rank of Captain in June 1902, he was stationed at Fort Grant, Arizona, with the 14th Cavalry.

In October 1903, Drake sailed to Jolo, Sulu, in the Philippines. Serving on the Second and Third Sulu Expeditions, he earned a Silver Star on both of them. While in the Philippines, Drake was recommended for a brevet promotion to Major. He was later awarded the Distinguished Service Cross for his heroism at the siege and taking of Cotta Pang Pang on February 14, 1904. The citation for the medal reads:

The President of the United States of America, authorized by Act of Congress, July 9, 1918, takes pleasure in presenting the Distinguished Service Cross to Captain (Cavalry) Charles Bryant Drake, United States Army, for extraordinary heroism in action while serving with 14th Cavalry, at the siege and taking of Cotta Pang Pang, Jolo, Philippine Islands, 14 February 1904. Captain Drake's conspicuous bravery and daring were demonstrated in leading the men to the firing line and being the first over the bamboo fence and the stone wall of the cotta.

After returning to the U.S., he served at the Boise Barracks, and from August 1906 to January 1909, he did recruiting duty at Fort Slocum. Arriving back in the Philippines, Drake served as a quartermaster at Fort Stotsenburg until March 1912. After he and his regiment returned to the U.S., he served in several positions, including participating in the Pancho Villa Expedition, in which he commanded a motor supply train.

Drake was appointed to organize the Motor Transport Corps in August 1918, during World War I, which he led until 1920 when it again became a part of the Quartermaster Corps. Drake received the Army Distinguished Service Medal for serving in this position, the citation for which stated the following:

The President of the United States of America, authorized by Act of Congress, July 9, 1918, takes pleasure in presenting the Army Distinguished Service Medal to Brigadier General Charles Bryant Drake, United States Army, for exceptionally meritorious and distinguished services to the Government of the United States, in a duty of great responsibility during World War I, in the organization of the Motor Transport Corps.

Drake was also promoted to the rank of brigadier general on October 1, 1918. After serving as an assistant to the Quartermaster General of the United States Army from July to September 1919, Drake served as an assistant to the Chief of Finance until February 1921. He then served as the Director of Cavalry at the Militia Bureau. Drake retired from the army on October 31, 1922, again at the rank of colonel. He was again promoted to brigadier general, post-retirement, on June 21, 1930.

Drake died of throat cancer on August 14, 1956, in Rehoboth Beach, Delaware shortly before he was to turn 84. He is buried at Arlington National Cemetery.

== Bibliography ==
- Davis, Henry Blaine Jr. (1998). Generals in Khaki. Raleigh, North Carolina: Pentland Press. ISBN 1571970886. OCLC 40298151.
