= Tasman Drake =

New Zealand clergyman and cricketer

Personal information
- Full name: William Tasman Drake
- Born: 2 December 1884; Hobart, Tasmania, Australia
- Died: 15 April 1946 (aged 61); Hastings, Hawke's Bay, New Zealand
- Batting: Right-handed

Career statistics
Competition	First-class
Matches	1
Runs scored	26
Batting average	13.00
100s/50s	0/0
Top score	15
Balls bowled	16
Wickets	1
Bowling average	20.00
5 wickets in innings	0
10 wickets in match	0
Best bowling	1/20
Catches/stumpings	0/0
- Source: Cricinfo, 8 November 2018

The Rev. William Tasman Drake (2 December 1884 – 15 April 1946) was an Anglican clergyman and cricketer in New Zealand.

== Life and clerical career ==
Tasman Drake was born in Hobart, Tasmania, but his family moved to New Zealand, and he was educated at schools in Invercargill and Dunedin. He studied for the Anglican clergy at Selwyn College in Dunedin.

He married Mary Mitchell (1887–1968) in Dunedin in December 1914. They had two sons and a daughter. One of his brothers was Ernest Drake, a popular tenor and conductor in New Zealand.

Drake served the Anglican Church as curate at Dunstan in Central Otago, vicar of Maniototo in Naseby from 1915, curate at Gisborne from 1918, vicar of Puketapu in Hawke's Bay from 1921, and vicar of Port Ahuriri in Napier from 1922 to 1927. After some time off for his health, he was organising secretary of the Diocese of Waiapu from 1929 to 1931, vicar of Waipawa in Hawke's Bay from 1931 to 1938, and vicar of St Matthew's Church, Hastings, from 1938 until his death in 1946.

== Cricket career ==
Drake's career in rural parishes in his younger days made it difficult for him to establish himself as a cricketer. He was prominent in local cricket as an all-rounder. Playing in two one-day matches for Naseby against Ranfurly in November and December 1914, he opened both the batting and the bowling, taking 6 for 33 in the first match, and making the match top score with 34 ("a good and merry innings") and taking 5 for 22 in the second.

During his residence in Gisborne, Drake played several representative matches for Poverty Bay. His batting helped them defend the Hawke Cup successfully twice in 1920 and 1921 when, opening the batting, he made the highest score on either side in each match: 45 not out against Manawatu and 63 against Wanganui. He was selected to represent the New Zealand Minor Associations in a first-class match against the touring Australians in March 1921. He and his teammates were overwhelmed by the Australians by an innings inside two days of the scheduled three-day match, but he did make 15 opening the first innings, which was the equal second-highest score for the innings; he also took a wicket.

At the time of his first-class match, Drake was described as "a sound bat with an extremely ugly but effective style [who] scores well all round the wicket", a "very useful change bowler and a brilliant field in any position".
