= Elias Franklin Drake =

American politician (1813–1892)

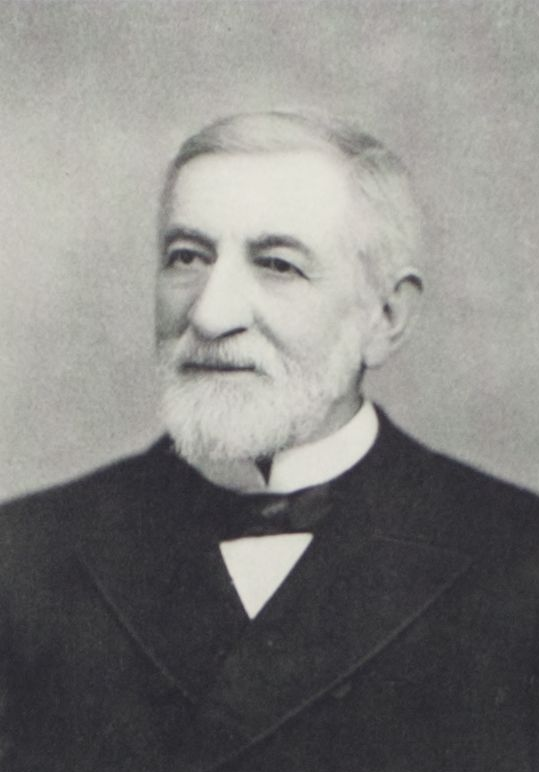

Member of the Minnesota Senate
- In office 1874–1875

Member of the Ohio House of Representatives
- In office 1844–1848

Personal details
- Born: December 21, 1813 Urbana, Ohio
- Died: February 14, 1892 (aged 78) San Diego, California
- Party: Whig; Republican
- Occupation: Businessman, politician

Elias Franklin Drake (December 21, 1813 – February 14, 1892) was an American businessman and politician.

== Biography ==
Drake was born in Urbana, Ohio. He worked with the bank in Xenia, Ohio, and was admitted to the Ohio bar. Drake was also served in the Ohio militia and was commissioned a colonel. Drake was involved in the railroad business. Franklin served in the Ohio House of Representatives from 1844 to 1848 and was a member of the Whig Party. He also served as speaker of the Ohio House of Representatives. Later Drake was involved in the Republican Party. In 1864, Drake moved to Saint Paul, Minnesota where he continued to be involved in the railroad business. He served in the Minnesota Senate as a Republican in 1874 and 1875. He died at the Hotel del Coronado near San Diego, California, after being in failing health.
