= Samuel Drake (antiquary) =

English antiquarian (1687/8–1753)

The Reverend Samuel Drake
- Rector of Treeton
- Appointed: 1728

Personal details
- Born: Pontefract, West Riding of Yorkshire
- Baptised: 23 April 1688
- Died: 5 March 1753 (aged ~76)
- Buried: St. Helen's Church, Treeton
- Denomination: Anglican
- Education: St. John's College, Cambridge

Samuel Drake (1687/8–1753) was an English Anglican clergyman and antiquary, and elder brother of Francis Drake. He proceeded M.A. at St. John's College, Cambridge, 1711, and D.D., 1724. He was rector of Treeton, Yorkshire, 1728–53, and vicar of Holme-on-Spalding Moor, 1733–53. He wrote on Christian ritual, and edited Bartholomew Clerke's Latin translation of Castiglione's Courtier, 1713.

== Life ==
Samuel Drake was born in Pontefract in 1687 or 1688, although some older sources give the earlier date of c. 1686. He was baptised on 23 April 1688, the son of Francis Drake, vicar of Pontefract, and elder brother of the historian Francis Drake. His grandfather was Samuel Drake, the Anglican divine. He graduated at St. John's College, Cambridge: B.A. 1707, M.A. 1711, B.D. 1718, and D.D. 1724. In 1728 he became rector of Treeton, Yorkshire; and in 1733, by dispensation, he also held the vicarage of Holme-on-Spalding Moor. He died 5 March 1753, aged about sixty-seven years, and was buried in the church of Treeton. Drake has been confounded with his grandfather of the same name.

== Works ==
In 1713 he edited Balthazar Castilionis Comitis libri iv. de Curiali sive Aulico ex Italico sermone in Latinum conversi, interprete Bartholomæo Clerke, 8vo. In 1719 appeared Concio ad Clerum, Vino Eucharistico aqua non necessario admiscenda. Drake defended himself against a reply by Thomas Wagstaffe, the nonjuror, in Ad Thomam Wagstaffe … Epistola; in quâ defenditur Concio, 1721, 8vo. Wagstaffe published Responsionis ad Concionem Vindiciæ, &c., in 1725. In 1720 Drake (then a fellow of his college) issued proposals for printing Archbishop Parker's great work on ecclesiastical antiquities. The elder Bowyer undertook the work, and brought it out in a handsome folio in 1729, under the title of Matthæi Parker … de Antiquitate Britannicæ Ecclesiæ. In 1724 Drake published another Concio, entitled Ara ignoto Deo Sacra, Cambridge, 4to.

== Sources ==
- Nichols, John, ed. (1812). Literary Anecdotes of the Eighteenth Century. Vol. 1. London: Nichols, Son, and Bentley. pp. 171, 193, 204, 243, 414, 420–1, 550.
- Westby-Gibson, John; Marchand, J. A. (2004). "Drake, Samuel (1687/8–1753), antiquary". Oxford Dictionary of National Biography. Oxford University Press. Retrieved 8 September 2022.

Attribution:

- This article incorporates text from a publication now in the public domain: Westby-Gibson, John (1888). "Drake, Samuel (1686?-1753)". In Stephen, Leslie (ed.). Dictionary of National Biography. Vol. 15. London: Smith, Elder & Co. p. 450.
