= Alexander Drake =

Alexander Drake may refer to:

- Alexander M. Drake (1859–1934), American pioneer
- Alexander Wilson Drake (1843–1916), American artist
