= Charles C. Drake =

United States Army Air Forces general

Charles Drake
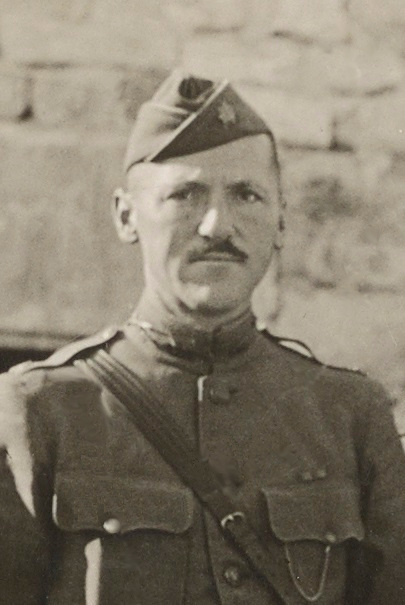
- Major Charles Drake in France, September 1918
- Born: November 2, 1887; Brockton, Massachusetts, US
- Died: July 16, 1984 (aged 96); Annandale, Virginia, US
- Burial place: Arlington National Cemetery
- Military career
- Allegiance: United States
- Branch: United States Army
- Service years: 1912–1946
- Rank: Brigadier General
- Service number: 0-3415
- Conflicts: Mexican Revolution • United States occupation of Veracruz; World War I • Aisne-Marne Offensive • Battle of Saint-Mihiel • Meuse–Argonne offensive World War II • Philippines Campaign (1941–1942) • Battle of Bataan • Battle of Corregidor
- Awards: Army Distinguished Service Medal; Prisoner of War Medal

Charles Chisholm Drake (November 2, 1887 – July 16, 1984) was an American brigadier general and quartermaster of the United States Army Forces in the Far East during the Battle of Bataan.

== Junior officer ==
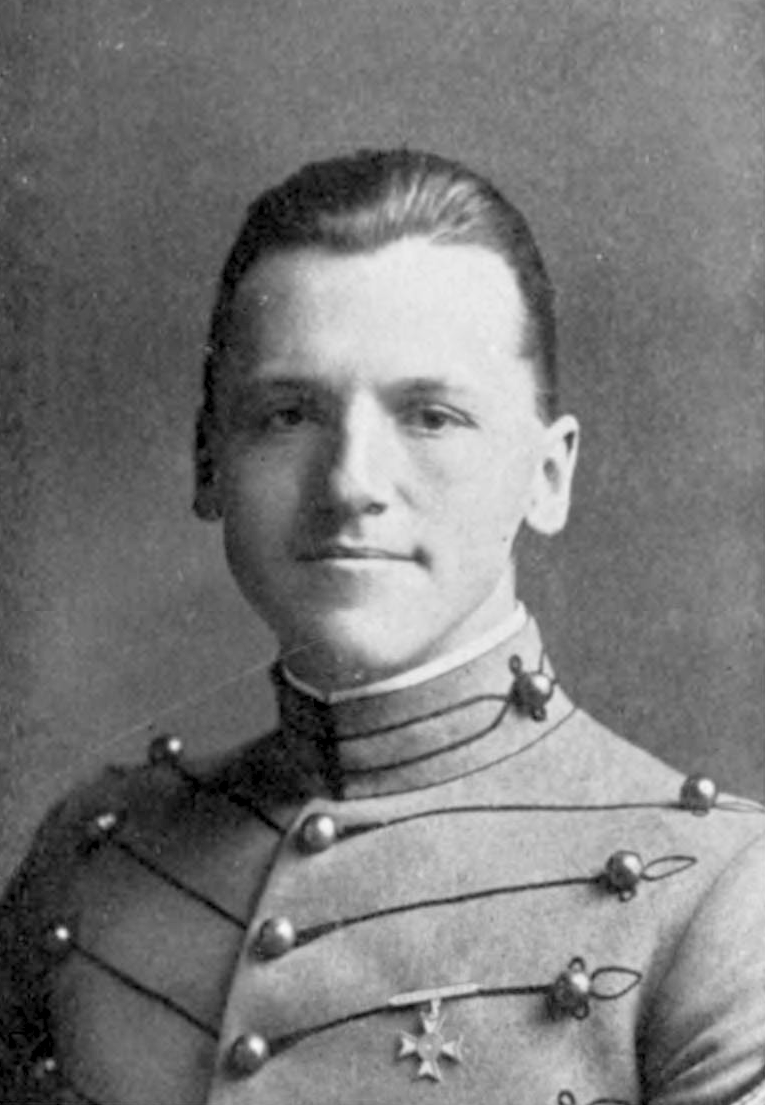
At West Point in 1912

Drake graduated from the United States Military Academy in June 1912 and was promoted to second lieutenant in the 7th Infantry Division. He participated in the United States occupation of Veracruz May 29 to October 20, 1914. He was promoted to first lieutenant on July 1, 1916.

== World War I ==
Drake was promoted to captain and transferred to the 58th Infantry Regiment on May 15, 1917, at Gettysburg, Pennsylvania. The unit was sent to France in May 1918 and Drake received a temporary promotion to major in June and subsequently participated in the Aisne-Marne Offensive, the Battle of Saint-Mihiel, and the Meuse–Argonne offensive.

== Between wars ==
Drake was permanently promoted to major and transferred to the Army Quartermaster Corps effective July 1, 1920. He graduated from the School of the Line in 1922, the General Staff School in 1923, the Quartermaster Corps School in 1924 and the United States Army War College in 1925.

== World War II ==
Promoted to brigadier general on December 24, 1941, Drake commanded the Quartermaster Corps in the Philippines during the Japanese invasion. He was third in command during the Battle of Corregidor in May 1942. Drake was held as a prisoner of war until 1945. He was awarded the Distinguished Service Medal and retired from the Army on October 31, 1946.

== Later life ==
Drake and his wife Maud Louise (Gates) Drake (1891–1962) lived in Bethesda, Maryland in the early 1960s. They had two daughters and five grandchildren. He died in 1984 in Annandale, Virginia. Drake and his wife are buried at Arlington National Cemetery.
