= Franklin J. Drake =

United States Navy admiral (1846–1929)

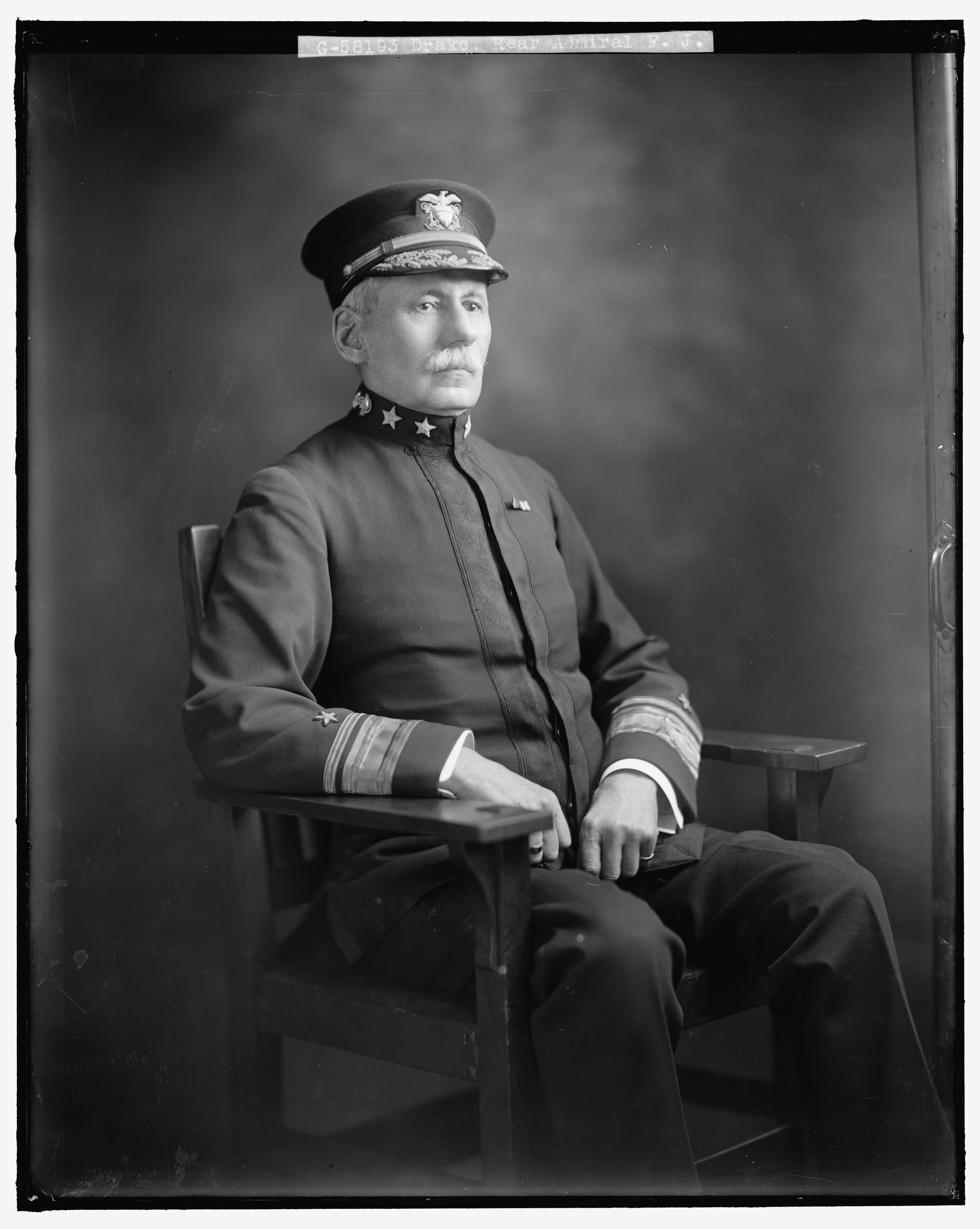
- Born: 4 March 1846; Yates, Orleans County, New York.
- Died: 30 January 1929 (aged 82); Washington, D.C.
- Burial place: Arlington National Cemetery, Arlington, Virginia
- Relatives: Sir Bernard Drake (ancestor)
- Military career
- Allegiance: United States of America
- Branch: United States Navy
- Service years: 1863–1906
- Rank: Rear Admiral
- Commands: Albatross (Fish Commission); USS Pensacola; USS Culgoa; USS Monterey; USS Wisconsin (BB-9)
- Conflicts: American Civil War; Union blockade; United States expedition to Korea; Spanish–American War
- Other work: Technical expert, Permanent Court of Arbitration

Franklin Jeremiah Drake (4 March 1846 – 30 January 1929) was a Rear Admiral in the United States Navy. He fought in the American Civil War and the United States expedition to Korea.

Drake was a descendant of the Royal Navy's Admiral Sir Bernard Drake (c. 1537–1586).

== Naval career ==
Drake was born on 4 March 1846 at Yates in Orleans County, New York. During the Civil War, he joined the Union Navy on 23 February 1863 at the age of sixteen. Drake served as an enlisted man in the North Atlantic Squadron, participating aboard the sloop-of-war USS Marion in the Union blockade of the Confederate States of America and in hunting Confederate privateers. Appointed a midshipman by competitive examination from New York's 31st congressional district, he entered the United States Naval Academy in Annapolis, Maryland on 24 July 1863. He performed duty aboard the steamer USS Gettysburg in 1865 and participated in practice cruises aboard the frigate USS Macedonian and the sloop-of-war USS Dale in 1867 before graduating on 2 June 1868. He was promoted to ensign on 19 April 1869.

Drake initially performed duty in the West Indies in 1868, then served aboard the gunboat USS Penobscot from 1868 to 1869 and aboard the steamer USS Frolic in 1869 and was promoted to ensign on 19 April 1869. He temporarily transferred to the United States Army from 1869 to 1870 for training and service as a signals officer, was promoted to master on 12 July 1870, and returned to Navy service as fleet signal officer of the Asiatic Squadron aboard the squadron's flagship, the screw frigate USS Colorado, from 1870 to 1871. In 1871, he served aboard the screw sloop-of-war USS Benicia in the Asiatic Squadron and commanded Company B in the land assault on Korean fortifications at Seoul during the American expedition to Korea of that year, and was commended for his actions by the commander of the landing force, Commander Lewis Kimberly.

Drake was aboard the sidewheel gunboat USS Monocacy in 1872, was promoted to lieutenant on 15 November 1872, and returned for a second tour aboard USS Colorado from 1872 to 1873. He was at the Naval Torpedo Station at Newport, Rhode Island, in 1873, and later that year was aboard the monitor USS Terror in the North Atlantic Squadron. He served aboard the sloop-of-war USS Portsmouth in the Pacific Squadron from in 1874, transferring to the steamer USS Pensacola of the same squadron later that year.

In 1875, Drake reported for duty aboard USS Independence, the receiving ship at the Mare Island Navy Yard in Vallejo, California. From 1875 to 1876, he was a member of the navy yard's ordnance department. From 1876 to 1878, he served aboard the United States Coast Survey steamer Hassler on surveying duty along the northwest coast of the United States and in 1878 was aboard the sidewheel steam frigate USS Powhatan in the North Atlantic Squadron.

From 1878 to 1881, Drake was on special service aboard the screw sloop-of-war USS Ticonderoga while she made a voyage around the world. During the voyage, he led a surveying expedition to Liberia in 1879 which mapped out the headwaters of the Saint John River and in the spring of 1880 conducted a reconnaissance of the Congo River during which he concluded a treaty with tribal chiefs along the south shore of the river between its mouth and its lower falls.

After returning to the United States, Drake was assigned to the New York Navy Yard at Brooklyn, New York, from 1881 to 1882, then had special duty from 1883 to 1885 on the first Advisory Board and as inspector of materiel in the U.S. Navy's construction of its first steel ships. He went to sea, serving in the European Squadron from 1885 to 1887, first aboard the screw steamer USS Pensacola in 1885 and then on the screw corvette USS Quinnebaug from 1886 to 1887. He returned to the United States aboard Pensacola in 1888 and that year took up duties as inspector of construction for USS Cushing, the U.S. Navy's first torpedo boat. From 1889 to 1891 he was inspector of construction for the Howell Automobile Torpedo, and in 1892 he had special duty at the Bureau of Ordnance for upcoming the World's Columbian Exhibition. In 1893 he was assistant inspector of construction for the new protected cruiser USS Montgomery, then being built at Columbian Iron Works in Baltimore, Maryland. He was promoted to lieutenant commander on 1 October 1893.

Drake returned to sea as commanding officer of the United States Fish Commission steamer Albatross in 1894. During his tour, Albatross completed the exploration of the seabed in the Bering Sea, studied the extent and flow of currents and their effect on the ice pack in and north of the Bering Strait, surveyed the Pribilof Islands, and studied the habitat of the fur seal and extent of the sealing belt in the area. He detached from Albatross in 1896 and reported aboard the new battleship USS Oregon in June 1896 as her executive officer. He remained aboard Oregon from her commissioning in July 1896 until 22 August 1897, and was credited with the training and development of the fighting efficiency of her crew that in 1898 allowed her to make her famous voyage from the Pacific Ocean to the Caribbean Sea and perform with great success in the Battle of Santiago de Cuba during the Spanish–American War.

After detaching from Oregon, Drake became inspector of ordnance at the Mare Island Navy Yard. During his tour there, he also oversaw the manufacture of gunpowder at the California Powder Works and conducted experiments to test the stability and keeping qualities of the Navy's new smokeless powder; he received a letter of thanks from Commodore George Dewey for the quality of ammunition supplied to the Asiatic Squadron during the Spanish–American War. In May 1898, he took up additional duty as commanding officer of the screw steamer USS Pensacola at the navy yard while retaining his position as inspector of ordnance, and was promoted to commander on 3 March 1899. In May 1900 received preliminary orders to command the steam sloop-of-war USS Mohican as a training ship.

Drake detached from Mare Island Navy Yard on 12 December 1900 and proceeded to duty in the Asiatic Squadron, where he took command of the refrigerated stores ship USS Culgoa on 17 March 1901. Detaching from Culgoa at Manila in Philippine Islands on 27 May 1901, he was ordered to Cavite Navy Yard at Cavite before taking command of the monitor USS Monterey on 8 July 1901. Drake was promoted to captain on 11 September 1903.

Drake was commanding officer of the battleship USS Wisconsin from 14 December 1904 until November 1906. He retired from the Navy as a rear admiral on 10 December 1906.

== Personal life ==
Drake was married to the former Martha J. V. McCarthy (1858–1912). He was an Original Companion of the Military Order of the Loyal Legion of the United States.

== Later career and death ==
From 1913 to 1915, Drake served as a technical expert for the Permanent Court of Arbitration at The Hague in the Netherlands. He was also a consultant on revisions of U.S. Navy regulations in 1918, 1919 and 1920.

Drake died at his home in Washington, D.C., on 30 January 1929. He was interred beside his wife at Arlington National Cemetery in Arlington, Virginia on 2 February 1929.
