= Frances Ann Denny Drake =

American actress and theatrical manager

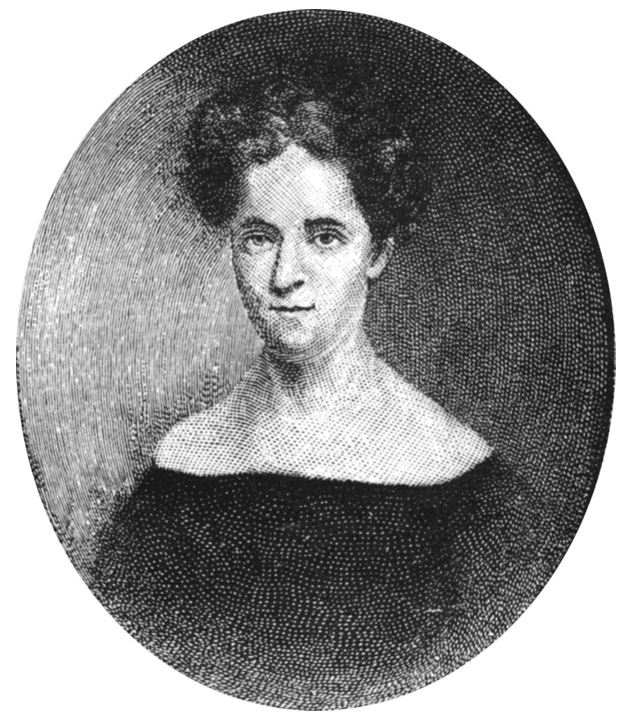
- Born: 6 November 1797; Schenectady
- Died: 6 September 1875 (aged 77); Louisville
- Occupation: Actor
- Spouse(s): Alexander Drake
- Children: Julia Drake Chapman

Frances Ann Denny Drake (November 6, 1797-September 1, 1875) was an American actress, foremost known as a tragedienne. She had a successful career from 1815 onward, toured all the United States and has been described as the perhaps most well-known actress in America prior to Charlotte Cushman.

Drake was born on November 6, 1797, in Schenectady, New York. Her acting debut came as Julia in the comedy The Midnight Hour in Cherry Valley, New York.

Joseph Jefferson said about her "Before Charlotte Cushman reached the height of her popularity the leading tragic actress of America was Mrs. A. Drake." Drake acted in New York between 1824 and 1835 in various roles, visited England in 1833. Drake's roles in plays included Bianaca in Fazio, Imogene in Bertram, Julia in The Hunchback, and Mrs. Haller in The Stranger as well as most heroines in Shakespeare's works.

In 1823, she married Alexander Drake, who headed the theatrical company in which she was a novice actress. They had a daughter and three sons. After his death in 1930, she married George W. Cutter, an attorney and activist. They lived in Covington, Kentucky, but an unhappy marriage led to a separation, and she once more used Drake as her last name.

On September 1, 1875, Drake died on her son's farm in Oldham County, Kentucky, aged 78.
