= Blacknall =

Blacknall is a surname. It may refer to:

- John Blacknall, a 16th-century mill-owner in England.
- Mary Blacknall, daughter of John Blacknall and wife of Sir Ralph Verney, 1st Baronet, of Middle Claydon.
- William Blacknall, a 16th-century mill-owner in England, great-grandfather of Mary Blacknall.
- Saeed Blacknall, an American coach and former NFL player known for 2016 Big Ten Football Championship Game.
- Ben Blacknall, an American football player and coach also former United States Air Force Sergeant.
- Derek Blacknall, defensive player for ECU Pirates starting in 2007. He later appeared in the video game NCAA Football 12.

== See also ==
- Blacknall Map
- Blacknall Memorial Presbyterian Church
- Richard D. Blacknall House
