= John Garrard (disambiguation) =

John Garrard (c. 1546–1625) was a merchant and Lord Mayor of London for 1602–03.

John Garrard may also refer to:

- Sir John Garrard, 1st Baronet (c. 1590–1637), of the Garrard baronets
- Sir John Garrard, 2nd Baronet (died 1686), of the Garrard baronets
- Sir John Garrard, 3rd Baronet (1638–1701), member of parliament for Amersham and Ludgershall

== See also ==
- Garrard (disambiguation)
