= Francis Drake (died 1634) =

(c.1580–1634) of Esher Place and Walton-on-Thames, Surrey

Francis Drake (c. 1580-1634), of Esher Place and Walton-on-Thames, Surrey, was an English Member of Parliament (MP).

He was the only son of Richard Drake of Esher Place and Ursula Stafford. He matriculated at New College, Oxford in July 1593, aged 13. Four years later he was admitted to the Inner Temple. He married his first wife Joan Tothill in 1603, shortly before his father's death. From his father he inherited a protracted and expensive lawsuit over the estate of his kinsman Francis Drake, the privateer, which was abandoned 3 years later. Although he became a gentleman pensioner to James I and a gentleman of the Privy chamber extraordinary to Charles I, he did not succeed in emulating his father's success as a courtier. His wife was a considerable heiress, but her health was poor. At her instigation the couple moved from Esher to Walton-on-Thames.

He was a Member of the Parliament of England for Sandwich in 1624. He was an MP for Amersham in 1625 and 1626 and Bridport in 1628. His activities as an MP indicate his puritan religious inclinations.

== Family ==
Drake married 3 times:

1. Joan (d. 1625), daughter and coheir of William Tothill of Shardeloes, Buckinghamshire, a Six Clerk in Chancery.
2. Philadelphia, daughter of Sir Edward Davies
3. Anne (d.1665), daughter of John Barlow of Petersfield, Hampshire and widow of Josias White, vicar of Hornchurch, Essex.

He died in March 1634 and was buried at Walton-on-Thames, Surrey. He left 2 sons who also sat in parliament: William and Francis.
