= Montague Garrard Drake =

British politician

Montague Garrard Drake (1692–1728), of Shardeloes, near Amersham, Buckinghamshire was a British Tory politician who sat in the House of Commons between 1713 and 1728.

== Life ==
Drake was the only surviving son of Montagu Drake MP of Shardeloes, near Amersham, Buckinghamshire and his wife Jane Garrard, daughter of Sir John Garrard, 3rd Baronet. His father died in 1698 and he succeeded to the estates. He was educated privately under Philip Ayres and matriculated at St John's College, Oxford on 16 July 1706 aged 15 and was awarded MA on 16 July 1709. From 1710 to 1712, he undertook the Grand Tour visiting Netherlands, Italy, Switzerland and France between 1710 and 1712 studying at Padua in 1710.

Drake was returned unopposed as Member of Parliament for Amersham at the 1713 British general election as soon as he came of age. He was re-elected in 1715 and in 1722, but in 1722 decided to sit for Buckinghamshire instead. He voted against the Administration in all recorded divisions. However, at the 1727 British general election, it was said that the populace were mutinous and so exasperated with the great Mr. Drake, [whom] they considered the chief promoter of the compromise and against the rights of the freeholders that he decided to return to Amersham where he was elected in 1727.

Drake's tomb in Amersham was designed and sculpted by Peter Scheemakers.

== Family ==
Drake married Isabella Marshall daughter of Thomas Marshall merchant of St. Michael Bassishaw, London on 13 October 1719. He died at Bath on 26 April 1728. His son William was also MP for Amersham.

Parliament of Great Britain
Preceded by John Drake; Francis Duncombe	Member of Parliament for Amerham; 1713–1722; With: The 1st Viscount Fermanagh 1713-1717; The 2nd Viscount Fermanagh 1717-1722	Succeeded by Thomas Chapman; The 2nd Viscount Fermanagh
Preceded by John Fleetwood; Richard Hampden	Member of Parliament for Buckinghamshire; 1722–1727; With: Sir Thomas Lee, 3rd Bt.	Succeeded by Sir William Stanhope; Richard Hampden
Preceded by Thomas Chapman; The 2nd Viscount Fermanagh	Member of Parliament for Amerham; 1727–1728; With: Baptist Leveson-Gower 1727-1728; Thomas Lutwyche 1728	Succeeded by Marmaduke Alington; Thomas Lutwyche
