= Molly Verney =

British artist (1675–1696)

Molley Verney
- Born: 1 January 1675
- Died: 1 February 1696 (aged 21); Kingdom of England
- Occupation: Genteel Lady
- Known for: Having the first recorded instance of using Japan as a verb in 1683
- Spouse: Mr.Kelyng

Mary Verney (1675 – February 1696) known also as Molly, & Mall Klenyg was an English noblewoman best known for having the first instance of recorded use of the word Japan as a verb in English in 1683.

== Biography ==
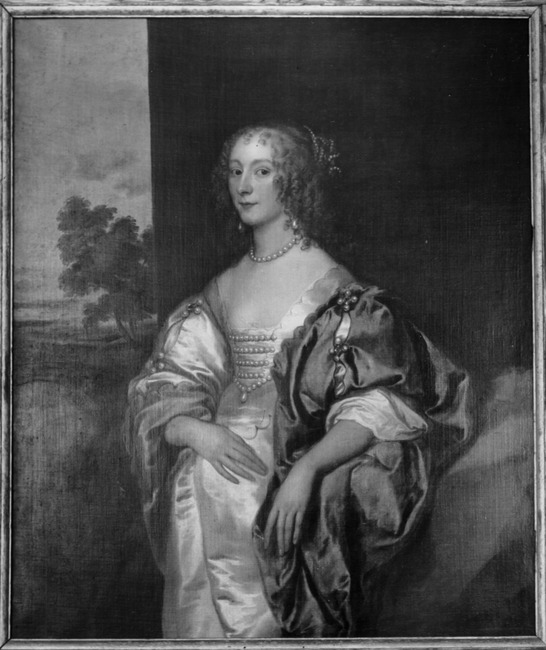
Mary Verney (1616-1650)

Verney was born in 1675 to Mary Abell (1641-1715) and Edmund Verney (1636-1688), the granddaughter of Mary Blacknall (1616-1650) and Ralph Verney (1613-1696). She had two brothers, Ralph (d.1686) and Edmund Verney (d.1690) who upon their deaths, made Verney heiress to the West Claydon estate. As early as 1679, the family would spend lavish amounts of money on Verney dressing her in silk frocks.

In 1682 she travelled with her father Edmund Verney to London to be engaged at Gorges School upon her request; Gorges being a boarding school for upper-class women (knocked down in 1762) which stood on the Cheyne Walk; where she took dancing and handcraft lessons run by Josias Priest. In 1688 her father died leaving the family with his debts, which Verney's guardian Ralph Verney (d. 1696) was reticent to pay, and caused a tightening of finances in Molly Verneys household expenses.

By 1690 she had become the heir of the estate, as her mother suffered from what was then called hysteria (most likely bipolar disorder or postnatal depression) and as such became more active in English society as an eligible heiress. The following year she began having an affair with a local cleric who worked for her mother. Aghast by the unsuitability of the match, her grandfather Ralph proposed she be engaged to the Gentleman Robert Dormer, the son of a nearby lawyer and Quainton landowner in 1692. However Verney turned down the offer and instead eloped with the son of John Kelyng; another prominent lawyer and landowner; in 1693 and married him in secret, moving in June 1693 to live with John Kelyng's wife in 'Fisher Street in Red Lion square'.

From 1694 to 1696 she had to persuade the Verney family to agree to the marriage, primarily that of her guardian now Baronet Ralph Verney. With the help of the Stewkely family (her Aunt Gardina and first cousin Cary Stewkeley) who argued to the Baronet that Verney would not simply marry for financial gain, Verney did eventually receive permission from the Baronet to marry, but she would not inherit her family estate, which instead went to the Abell family. She gave birth but died of childbirth complications in February 1696, and her infant daughter Mary also died 3 months later.

== Women in Japanning ==
Japanning first began in Europe in 1610 in the Netherlands, and due to England's close trade relations would likely have traded objects which employed lacquerware. Certainly by 1679 it had become a trade among English tradesmen working for the English landed gentry. Due to the limited understanding of Asian cartography in the 17th century, China was often conflated with Japan and Indian artforms, often producing fantastical as well as grounded images of the Indian taste, which is often academically referred to as Chinoiserie. Most of these images came from travel accounts written by European travellers or from imported EIC goods through their warehouse and a number of private merchants. A number of travellers accounts also appeared such as Marco Polo (1254-1324) and Engelbert Kaempfer (1651 -1716) which helped increased knowledge of Asian countries though maps, and illustrated depictions of travellers accounts.

Women were not the primary audience for Japanning in the 17th century, but a rising number of women spending increasing time in the domestic sphere were introduced by writers like Hannah Woolley in 1675 who advocated for women to '"adorn" rooms with decorative "fancies"'. When Verney began learning to Jappan in 1683 when her father 'Mun' believed the craft made her more suitable to merit her being placed in 'the household of some lady of quality - [having Japanning help with] paying her board and wages'. To learn the craft, Edmund Verney paid 40 shillings for Verney to learn the handicraft in London.

'I find you have a desire to learn Jappan, as you call it, and I approve it; and so I shall of any thing that is good and virtuous [. . .] for I admire all accomplishments that will render you considerable and lovely in the sight of God and man' - Edmund Verney to Molly Verney 1683

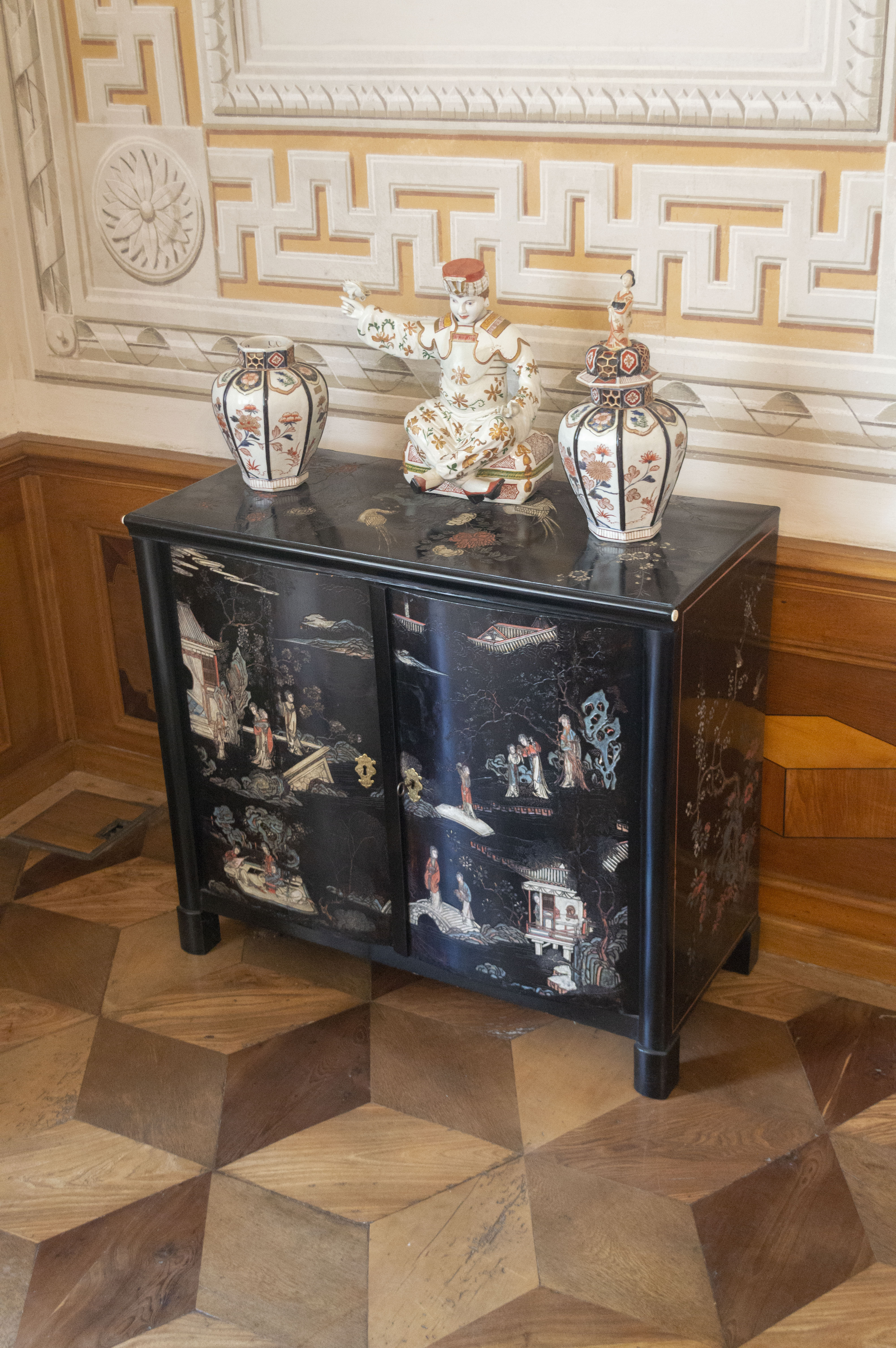
An example of Kakiemon and Japanning

Kakiemon porcelain and Lacquer in particular were particularly rare, and so home-made alternatives were often purchased and offered by amateurs and cabinet makers as well. In 1689 the Duke of Hamilton reported to his wife that 'for my part I think a counterfeit one looks as well ... so let me know if you will take such a one'. 'Lac' as it was known in the period, was hard to come by, and the rarity drove up the cost of individual items of lacquerware, so that it became a side trade for some cabinetmakers and upholsterers to produce these pieces of Japanned furniture. Japanese lacquer is a lengthy skilled process made using the sap of the Toxicodendron vernicifluum, and as this resource did not grow in Europe, plus the demand from patrons, furniture makers began to produce imitation ebonized lacquers from spirit varnish and oil resins and became known as 'japanning'. The trend was bolstered by Mary II during her reign due to her porcelain collection formed in 1689-1694 at Hampton Court Palace which drew from fashionable Netherlands interior designs. By 1710 Japanning had been established as a womanly pursuit, and was drawn upon by those such as Alexander Pope in a nod to a female audience.

Throughout the period of 1680-1760 it was considered a 'genteel' occupation like for example needlework, with application to wooden surfaces using decorative patterning being seen as a respectable hobby for and with young women. A number of instruction manuals were published between 1697 and 1766 instructing young women how to 'Jappan' established the art as one for women. These design and pattern books often were designed for amateurs, so they provided fantastical copy and paste motifs for new Japanners to varnish and 'paint' or apply these images to flat objects or spaces, and became popular as pictorial books in their own right for their Oriental images. These mock lacquer techniques were often suggested to be applied to fabrics, but also become incredibly popular by the 18th century and are found on cabinets, tea-trays, powderboxes, drawers, etc. Some of these forms went so far from the source material, they can said to be an early form of Japonaiserie. Certain motifs included landskips with woods, cottages, rivers, trees, hills, [the] sun, moon [&] stars'.
