= Edward Drake (cricketer) =

English clergyman & cricketer (1832–1904)

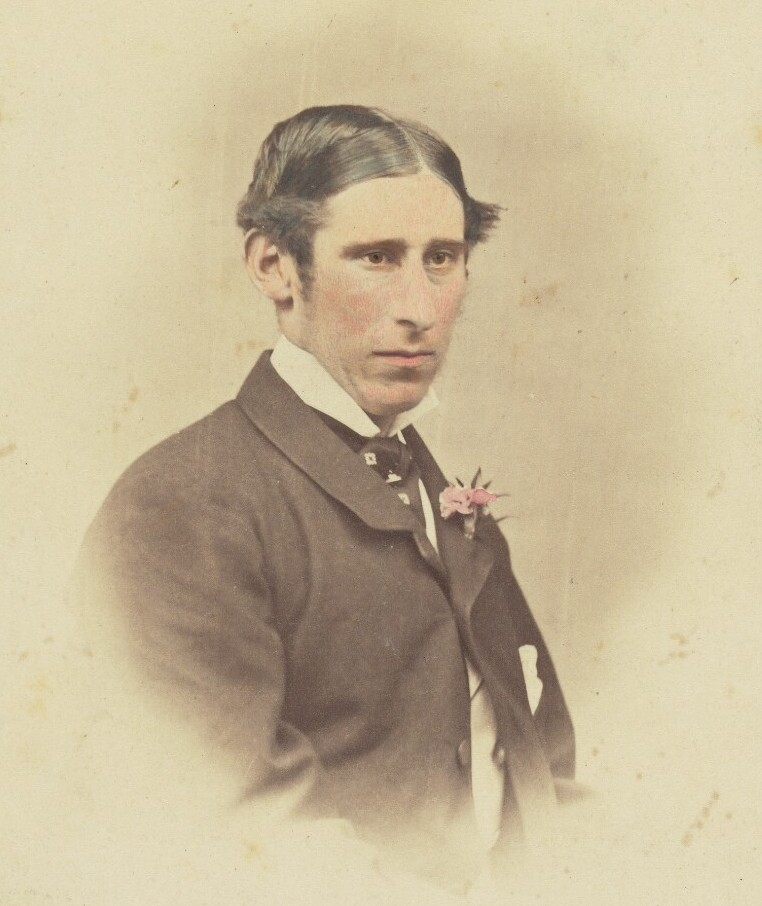
Drake, c. 1850 – 1970

Edward Tyrwhitt Drake (15 May 1832 – 20 June 1904) was an English clergyman and first-class cricketer who played for Cambridge University, the Gentlemen, England, the Marylebone Cricket Club and other amateur sides between 1853 and 1873. He and other members of his extended family are often recorded by the double-barrelled surname of "Tyrwhitt-Drake". He was born at Bucknell, near Bicester, Oxfordshire and died at Amersham, Buckinghamshire.

== Family and career ==
Edward Drake was the third son of Thomas Tyrwhitt-Drake, Member of Parliament for the rotten borough of Amersham until the Reform Act 1832 and head of a long-standing Buckinghamshire family which effectively controlled both the parliamentary seat and many local affairs in the town, including the benefice of St Mary's Church, Amersham: a Mr Tyrwhitt-Drake is still in 2014 the "patron" of the church. The family claimed descent from Sir Francis Drake.

Drake was educated at Westminster School and initially at Trinity College, Cambridge, later moving to Magdalene College. He graduated with a BA in 1854 and a MA in 1857 and was then ordained as a priest in the Church of England. He was curate at Chalfont St Peter from 1860 to 1863 when he was appointed as rector of Amersham, his family's church, where he remained until his death in 1904. As well as his church duties, Drake was also a Justice of the Peace and a Deputy Lieutenant of Buckinghamshire. He was unmarried.

== Cricket career ==
As a cricketer, Drake was a right-handed batsman and a right-handed under-arm slow lob bowler; initially he appears to have played primarily as a bowler with considerable success in the mid-1850s, but later he played largely as a batsman. The 19th century cricket writer Arthur Haygarth, writing in the fourth volume of his Scores and Biographies and quoted in Drake's obituary in Wisden Cricketers' Almanack in 1905, described Drake thus: "Is a very fine, energetic, and most active field anywhere, generally, however, taking long-leg and middle-wicket. Bowls slow under-hand 'lobs', twisting in from the leg to the off. At times they are very telling, but the analysis shows that they receive a good deal of punishment. As a batsman (using a bat of great weight) he is one of the most slashing that has yet appeared, hitting at almost everything, and generally sending the ball all over the ground." Wisden itself concluded that "his fame as a cricketer was chiefly due to his skill as a lob bowler, he being ranked as second only to V. E. Walker – longo intervallo, however. Still a careful perusal of scores leads one to believe that he was of more assistance to a side as a batsman than as a bowler."

Drake's first important match was the 1852 University match against Oxford University, and although Cambridge, batting one man short, lost by an innings, Drake took the wickets of five of the top six Oxford batsmen, though the full scorecard is not known. He played in the University match again in 1853, but his big success that year came when he turned out for "the Gentlemen of England" against "the Gentlemen of Kent" in a match at St Lawrence Ground, Canterbury: again, full figures have not been preserved, but it is known that Drake took six wickets in each innings of the game.

In both 1854 and 1855, Drake, with 65 and 48 wickets, was among the leading bowlers of the season, finishing fourth in terms of numbers of wickets taken in each year, both times behind bowlers who bowled considerably more frequently than he did. In each of these seasons he took 10 wickets or more in a match three times, and while he took more wickets for Gentlemen of England teams than for any other, with 67 wickets in eight games, his best innings and match analyses – 8/61 and 13/106 – were for MCC in a match against Gentlemen of England in 1855. After 1856, his bowling declined but his batting developed. In 1857, in the Gentlemen v Players match at Lord's, the Gentlemen were set 128 to win but made only 114; Drake, however, scored 58 of these runs and only one other member of the side reached double figures. His highest innings was 88 for MCC in 1858 against Cambridge University. Though his first-class cricket became very intermittent after 1859, he made 79 for MCC again against Cambridge University in 1865 and the following year he took nine Sussex wickets in another MCC game. His final first-class match came in 1873.

Drake and other members of his family were also involved in the formation of Buckinghamshire Cricket Club from 1864 and a local newspaper in the county dubbed him "the prince of Buckinghamshire cricketers". The Tyrwhitt-Drakes organised family and estate games at their property at Shardeloes, in Amersham.

== Other sports ==
Drake was an enthusiastic supporter of fox-hunting, and kept and rode horses, using the pseudonym "Mr Ekard". He competed in the Grand National steeplechase at Aintree Racecourse in Liverpool in 1860 and finished seventh on a horse called Bridegroom; the same horse finished fourth in 1861 with a different rider (although Drake's obituary in the local Buckinghamshire newspaper in 1904 claimed that Drake had finished fourth in the Grand National). He used the same pseudonym for some cricket matches for MCC after he had been ordained as a clergyman.
