= Thomas Tyrwhitt-Drake =

British Member of Parliament

Captain Thomas Tyrwhitt-Drake (10 March 1783 – 21 March 1852) was a British Member of Parliament (MP) for Amersham from 1805 to 1832.

== Personal life ==
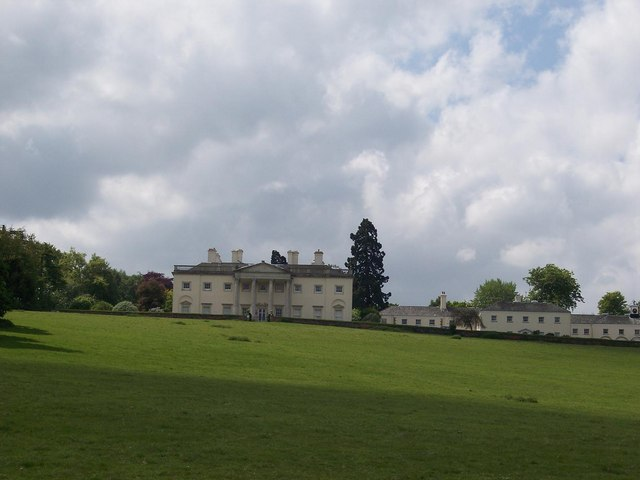
Shardeloes, Buckinghamshire, the Drake family seat

Tyrwhitt-Drake was born on 10 March 1783, the eldest son of Captain Thomas Drake Tyrwhitt-Drake, MP for Amersham from 1795 to 1810, and his wife Anne, daughter of the Reverend William Wickham of Garsington, Oxfordshire. The elder Tyrwhitt-Drake was the son of William Drake, a long-standing MP for Amersham; the elder Thomas adopted the surname Tyrwhitt in 1776 in order to inherit the estates of his cousin Sir John de la Fountain Tyrwhitt, sixth Baronet, and then the additional surname of Drake in 1796 when his father died. He was commissioned into the South Buckinghamshire Yeomanry as a Captain in 1803.

=== Family ===
On 15 October 1814, Tyrwhitt-Drake married Barbara Caroline Annesley, a daughter of Arthur Annesley of Bletchington Park, Oxfordshire. Together, they had four sons and eight daughters:

- Thomas Tyrwhitt-Drake JP DL (1818–1888) was educated at Westminster School and Christ Church, Oxford, matriculating in 1837. He was a Justice of the Peace and Deputy Lieutenant, as well as High Sheriff of Buckinghamshire in 1859, and was known as "Squire Drake", for his love of hunting. In 1843, he married Elizabeth Julia, widow of Colonel Wedderburn and daughter of John Stratton, and had children.
- Reverend John Tyrwhitt-Drake (born 1821) married Emily Charlotte Micklethwaite, daughter of Nathaniel Micklethwaite of Taverham Hall, Norfolk, and had children.
- Reverend Edward Tyrwhitt-Drake JP (1832–1904), who was the Rector of Amersham
- George
- Barbara Anne Tyrwhitt-Drake
- Frances Isabella Tyrwhitt-Drake
- Mary Elizabeth Tyrwhitt-Drake
- Augusta Charlotte Tyrwhitt-Drake married Reverend James Annesley Dawkins in 1853 and had children.
- Susan Louisa Tyrwhitt-Drake
- Elizabeth Catherine Tyrwhitt-Drake (died 1899) married Wager Townley Allix (died 1878) in 1862 and had two daughters, Barbara Elizabeth and Agnes Marjorie.
- Charlotte Diana Tyrwhitt-Drake married Captain Edward Chapman Clayton in 1860 and had children.
- Agnes Agatha Tyrwhitt-Drake

== Member of Parliament ==
The two-member borough of Amersham was a "rotten borough", effectively under the control ("in the pocket of") the Drake family. In 1796, Tyrwhitt-Drake's grandfather retired and his son Charles Drake Garrard took over his seat; the elder Tyrwhitt-Drake, being the eldest son of William Drake, was already the second Member. In 1805, Charles Drake Garrard resigned his seat in favour of the younger Tyrwhitt-Drake, who was duly returned for the borough in his place.

He was considered a "doubtful" support of Pitt when he was first elected. He voted for repealing the Additional Force Act in 1806, and was considered a supporter of the Duke of Portland's Tory ministry in 1810, voting in favour of that Government's regency proposals in 1811 and other Government measures in 1812. Although ministers considered him a supporter of the Earl of Liverpool's Government after the 1812 election, he rarely attended the House, and is recorded as having voted once in the 1812–1818 Parliament, and twice in the 1818–1820 Parliament.

After 1820, he was still an irregular attender. He voted against Catholic Relief in the early 1820s, and the Irish Franchise Bill in 1823, though he did deliver his constituency's petition for the Abolition of Slavery in 1824. When he did vote, he generally supported the government in this period, with one exception in 1825. After his re-election in 1826, he gave his support to the Corn Laws and the protection of agriculture. He continued to oppose Catholic relief, introducing, for instance, a petition against Catholic Emancipation in 1829. After 1830, he voted against electoral reform in 1831 and consistently opposed the Reform Bill introduced later in that year; in particular, he protested about the abolishing of Amersham as a constituency. When that bill became the Great Reform Act 1832, Tyrwhitt-Drake thereby lost his seat.

== Later life ==
Tyrwhitt-Drake took little part in politics at even a local level after 1832, though he did raise his objections over the repealing of the Corn Laws in the following decade. He was a keen hunter, who was described in the History of Parliament as "one of the wealthiest commoners of his day". He died 21 March 1852, leaving annuities to his wife and children, and passing his estates on to his eldest son, Thomas.

Parliament of the United Kingdom
Preceded by Thomas Drake Tyrwhitt-Drake; Charles Drake Garrard	Member of Parliament for Amersham; 1805 – 1832; With: Thomas Drake Tyrwhitt-Drake (1805–1810); William Tyrwhitt-Drake (1810–1832)	Succeeded by Constituency abolished
