= Thomas Garrard =

Thomas Garrard may refer to:

- Thomas Gerrard or Garrard, (1498–1540) English Protestant reformer
- Sir Thomas Garrard, 2nd Baronet (1627–c. 1690), of the Garrard baronets
