= Marmaduke Alington =

British lawyer and Tory politician

Marmaduke Alington (September 1671 – 1749), of Swinhope, Lincolnshire. and Broxbourne, Hertfordshire, was a British lawyer and Tory politician who sat in the House of Commons from 1728 to 1734.

== Early life, education ==
Alington was the eldest son of Henry Alington of Swinhope and his wife Elizabeth Gamble, daughter of William Gamble (AKA Bowyear) of Leytonstone, Essex. He was educated at Merchant Taylors' School from 1683 to 1687 and succeeded his father in 1690.

== Career ==
He was admitted at Lincoln's Inn in 1693 and was called to the bar in 1708.

Alington was appointed Recorder of Hertford in 1714 and became a bencher of his Inn in 1724. He was family lawyer to the Drakes of Shardeloes, and was returned on their interest as a Tory Member of Parliament for Amersham at a by-election on 16 May 1728. The only vote he is known to have cast was against the Excise Bill in 1733. He did not stand again at the 1734 British general election.

== Death ==
Alington died unmarried on 5 September 1749.

Parliament of Great Britain
Preceded by Montague Garrard Drake; Thomas Lutwyche	Member of Parliament for Amersham; 1728–1734; With: Thomas Lutwyche	Succeeded by Sir Henry Marshall; Thomas Lutwyche
