= Henry Marshall (MP) =

British merchant and Tory politician

Sir Henry Marshall (1688–1754), of St. Mary at Hill, London and Theddlethorpe, Lincolnshire, was a British merchant and Tory politician who sat in the House of Commons from 1734 to 1754. He was sheriff of the City of London in 1740 and Lord Mayor of London for the year 1744 to 1745

Marshall was baptized in March 1688, the eldest surviving son of Charles Marshall, grocer, of St. Mary at Hill, London and his wife Margaret Loades, daughter of Henry Loades, chamberlain of London. He succeeded his father in 1708.

At the 1734 British general election, Marshall was elected in a contest as a Tory Member of Parliament for Amersham on the interest of the Drake family, to whom he was related. He voted consistently against the Administration and on 31 March 1736 he voted against the Westminster bridge bill, which the common council of the city of London were opposed to. He was elected Alderman of Farringdon Within ward on 10 November 1737. In 1738 he served on a committee of aldermen formed to submit their complaints against Spanish depredations to Parliament. He was on several committees of the common council, and of the corporation. He was Master of the Drapers' Company for the year 1738 to 1739 and Sheriff of London for the year 1740 to 1741. In Parliament, he was one of the Tories who voted against the motion for Walpole's dismissal in February 1741. He was returned unopposed as MP for Amersham at the 1741 British general election.

In 1744 he became Lord Mayor of London, and during his term in 1745, he and Sir John Barnard 'industriously and artfully surprised the City' into voting a loyal address on the rebellion. He was knighted on 5 September 1745. At the end of his mayoralty, he was appointed president of St Bartholomew's Hospital and received the thanks of the common council. In the 1747 election he was returned unopposed as MP for Amersham.

Marshall died unmarried on 2 February 1754.

Parliament of Great Britain
| Preceded by Marmaduke Alington; Thomas Lutwyche | Member of Parliament for Amersham; 1734–1754; With: Thomas Lutwyche; Thomas Gore 1735; William Drake, Sr | Succeeded by Isaac Whittington; William Drake, Sr |
Civic offices
| Preceded by Sir Robert Westley | Lord Mayor of London; 1744– 1745 | Succeeded by Sir Richard Hoare |
