= Charles Drake Garrard =

British politician

Lieutenant-Colonel Charles Drake Garrard (baptized 23 December 1755 – 17 July 1817), born Charles Drake was a British land-owner and Member of Parliament for Amersham between 1796 and 1805.

== Early life and family ==
Charles Drake was baptised on 23 December 1755, the fourth son of William Drake, a long-standing Member of Parliament for Amersham, and his wife, Elizabeth, a daughter of John Raworth of London, a director of the South Seas Company.

Drake inherited the estate of his (great-grandmother's) cousin Benet Garrard, sixth Baronet, in 1767, and added the name Garrard to his surname (see Garrard Baronets). He married on 8 June 1790, Anne Barne, daughter of Miles Barne of Sotterley, Suffolk, and his second wife Mary Thornhill, a daughter of George Thornhill of Diddington, Huntingdonshire. Together, they had one son and five daughters:

- Charles Benet Drake Garrard (born 1806) was a magistrate for Hertfordshire and was Sheriff of that county in 1839. He married, in 185, Honora Henrietta Pauncefort Duncombe, the daughter of Philip Duncombe Pauncefort Duncombe and his wife Lady Alicia Margaretta Hockmore Lambert, a daughter of Richard Lambart, seventh Earl of Cavan; Miss Pauncefort Duncombe was a sister to the first of the Pauncefort-Duncombe baronets.
- Anne Drake Garrard.
- Charlotte Drake Garrard. She married George Henry Cherry, of Denford House, Berkshire.
- Caroline Drake Garrard. She married William Dawson of St Leonard's, Berkshire.
- Louisa Drake Garrard, who had died unmarried by 1852.
- Emily Drake Garrard. Married the Rev. John Tyrwhitt-Drake, rector of Amersham.

He was commissioned a Lieutenant-Colonel in the Hertfordshire Militia of 1794.

== Member of Parliament and later life ==
The borough of Amersham was a "Rotten Borough", in the pocket (i.e. under the control of) the Garrard family. When William Drake retired at the 1796 election, Garrard stepped up as the family's representative. An inactive member, Garrard is not known to have spoken or voted in Parliament during his tenure as Member for Amersham. He retired and his nephew, Thomas Tywhitt Drake, took his place as Member.

After retiring from Parliament, he served as a Gentleman of the Privy Chamber from 1806 to 1813, and he died on 17 July 1817.

Parliament of Great Britain
Preceded by William Drake; Thomas Drake Tyrwhitt-Drake	Member of Parliament for Amersham; 1796–1800; With: Thomas Drake Tyrwhitt-Drake	Succeeded by Parliament of the United Kingdom
Parliament of the United Kingdom
Preceded by Parliament of Great Britain	Member of Parliament for Amersham; 1801–1805; With: Thomas Drake Tyrwhitt-Drake	Succeeded by Thomas Drake Tyrwhitt-Drake; Thomas Tyrwhitt-Drake
