= William Cheyne, 2nd Viscount Newhaven =

English politician

Arms of Cheyne, Viscount Newhaven: Chequy or and azure, a fesse gules, fretty argent

William Cheyne, 2nd Viscount Newhaven (14 July 1657 – 26 May 1728) was an English Tory politician and peer who sat in the House of Commons of England from 1681 until 1707 when as a viscount in the Peerage of Scotland he was required to sit in the House of Lords.

== Life ==
Cheyne was the son of Charles Cheyne, 1st Viscount Newhaven, and his wife Lady Jane Cavendish, daughter of the first Duke of Newcastle . He matriculated at Brasenose College, Oxford, on 14 July 1671 aged 14.

In 1681, Cheyne was elected Member of Parliament for Amersham and sat until 1687. He was elected MP for Appleby in 1689 and sat until 1695. In 1696 he was elected MP for Buckinghamshire and held the seat until 1701. In that time he was three times also elected for Amersham, but chose to sit for Buckinghamshire. He was Colonel of the Buckinghamshire Militia at the muster of 1697. He succeeded to the title and the estates at Chelsea on the death of his father in 1698.

He was re-elected MP for Buckinghamshire in 1702 and sat until 1705. He served as Lord Lieutenant of Buckinghamshire for six months in 1702 until opposed by the Whigs. He was also given the sinecure of Clerk of the Pipe in 1703 which he was able to keep until 1706 in spite of pressure from the Whigs. He was then elected MP for Amersham and sat until 1707 when under the Acts of Union 1707, having a Scottish peerage, he was required to sit in the House of Lords. He nevertheless retained an interest in politics and in 1711 regained his position as Clerk of the Pipe for life and in 1712 was made Lord Lieutenant of Buckinghamshire for the second time, losing the lieutenancy on the succession of King George I in 1714.

In 1712, he sold the estates in Chelsea to Sir Hans Sloane. Cheyne Walk was named after him.

After he died, without heir, in 1728 he was buried in Drayton Beauchamp in Buckinghamshire. He was the last of the Cheyne family after whom Chenies in Buckinghamshire is named.

Parliament of England
Preceded by Sir William Drake; Sir Roger Hill	Member of Parliament for Amersham; 1681–1687; With: Sir William Drake	Succeeded by Sir William Drake; Edmund Waller
Preceded by Philip Musgrave; Richard Lowther	Member of Parliament for Appleby; 1689–1695; With: Richard Lowther 1689–1690; Lord Clifford 1690–1694; Sir John Walter, Bt 1694–1695	Succeeded by Sir William Twysden, Bt; Sir Christopher Musgrave, Bt
Preceded by Hon. Thomas Wharton; Sir Richard Atkins, Bt	Member of Parliament for Buckinghamshire; 1696–1701; With: Sir Richard Atkins, Bt 1696; Henry Neale 1696–1698; Hon. Goodwin Wharton 1698–1701	Succeeded by Hon. Goodwin Wharton; Robert Dormer
Preceded by Edmund Waller; Montagu Drake	Member of Parliament for Amersham; 1698–1699; With: Sir John Garrard, Bt	Succeeded by Sir John Garrard, Bt; John Drake
Preceded by Sir John Garrard, Bt; John Drake	Member of Parliament for Amersham; 1701; With: Sir Samuel Garrard, Bt 1701; John Drake 1701	Succeeded by John Drake; Sir Samuel Garrard, Bt
Preceded by John Drake; Sir Samuel Garrard, Bt	Member of Parliament for Amersham; 1701–1702; With: John Drake	Succeeded by John Drake; Sir Samuel Garrard, Bt
Preceded by Hon. Goodwin Wharton; Robert Dormer	Member of Parliament for Buckinghamshire; 1702–1705; With: Hon. Goodwin Wharton 1702–1704; Sir Richard Temple, Bt 1704–1705	Succeeded by Sir Richard Temple, Bt; Robert Dormer
Preceded by John Drake; Sir Samuel Garrard, Bt	Member of Parliament for Amersham; 1705–1707; With: Sir Samuel Garrard, Bt	Succeeded by Sir Samuel Garrard, Bt; John Drake
Honorary titles
Preceded by The Marquess of Wharton	Lord Lieutenant of Buckinghamshire; 1702	Succeeded by The Earl of Bridgewater
Preceded by The Duke of Kent	Lord Lieutenant of Buckinghamshire; 1712–1714	Succeeded by The Earl of Bridgewater
Peerage of Scotland
Preceded by Charles Cheyne	Viscount Newhaven; 1698–1728	Extinct
