= Earl Verney =

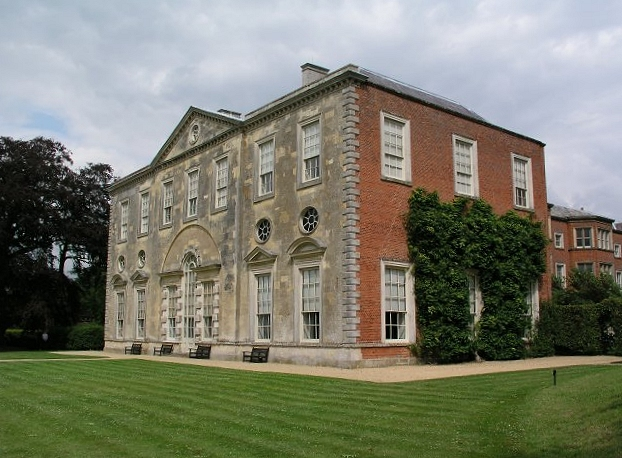
Claydon House, the seat of the Verney family.

Earl Verney, in the Province of Leinster, was a title in the Peerage of Ireland. Sir Ralph Verney sat as a member of parliament for Aylesbury, for Great Bedwyn and for Buckingham. In 1661 he was created a Baronet, of Middle Claydon in the County of Buckingham, in the Baronetage of England. His son Sir John Verney, Bt, was a member of parliament for Buckinghamshire and for Amersham. In 1703, he was raised to the Peerage of Ireland as Baron Verney of Belturbet, in the County of Cavan, and Viscount Fermanagh. His son, the second Viscount, represented Amersham and Wendover in Parliament. In 1742 he was created Earl Verney, in the Province of Leinster, in the Peerage of Ireland. However, all titles became extinct on the death of his son, the second Earl, in 1791.

The Fermanagh title was revived in 1792 for Mary Verney, who was created Baroness Fermanagh in the Peerage of Ireland. She was the posthumous daughter of Hon. John Verney, second son of the first Earl Verney. However, Lady Fermanagh never married and on her death this title became extinct as well.

The original seat of Earl Verney was Claydon House near the villages of Botolph Claydon, Middle Claydon (hence the title), Steeple Claydon and East Claydon.

== Verney Baronets, of Middle Claydon (1661) ==
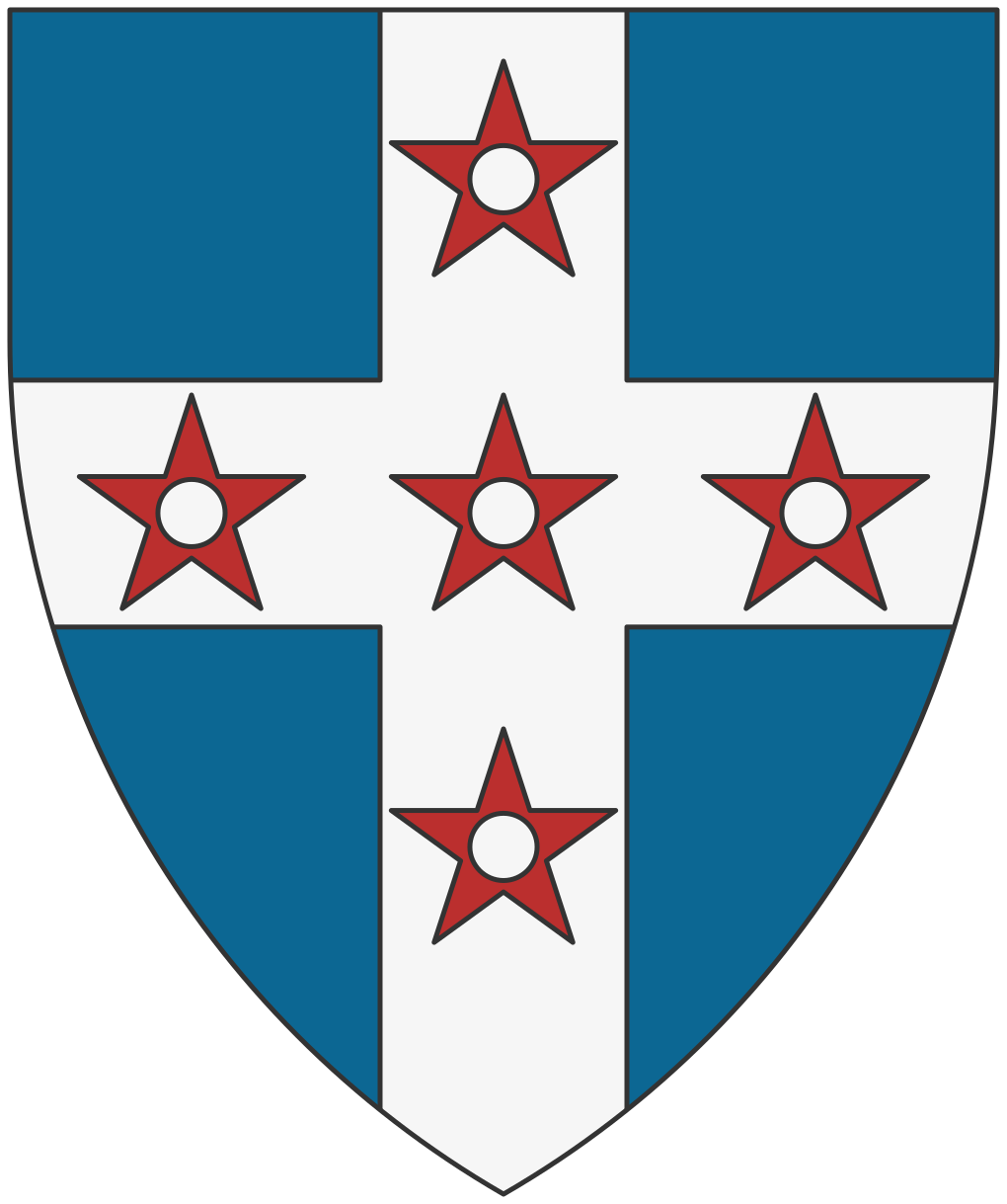
Arms of Verney of Middle Claydon, Viscounts Fermanagh, Earls Verney

- Sir Ralph Verney, 1st Baronet (1613–1696)
- Sir John Verney, 2nd Baronet (1640–1717) (created Viscount Fermanagh in 1703)

== Viscounts Fermanagh (1703) ==
- John Verney, 1st Viscount Fermanagh (1640–1717)
- Ralph Verney, 2nd Viscount Fermanagh (1683–1752) (created Earl Verney in 1742)

== Earls Verney (1742) ==
- Ralph Verney, 1st Earl Verney (1683–1752)
- Ralph Verney, 2nd Earl Verney (1714–1791)

== Baronesses Fermanagh (1792) ==
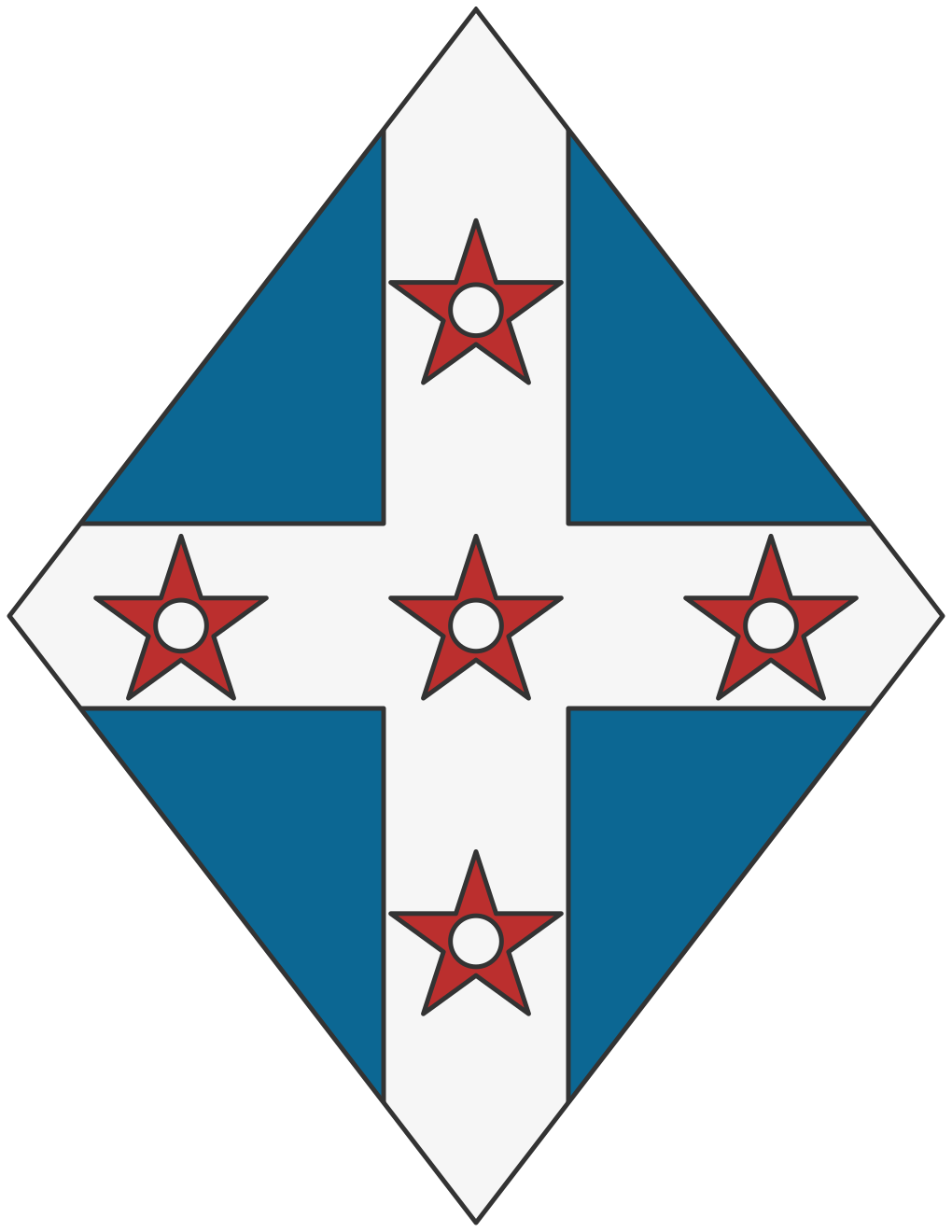
Arms of Verney, Baroness Fermanagh

- Mary Verney, 1st Baroness Fermanagh (1737–1810)

== See also ==
- Verney Baronets
