= Abingdon Sword =

Late Anglo-Saxon iron sword and hilt

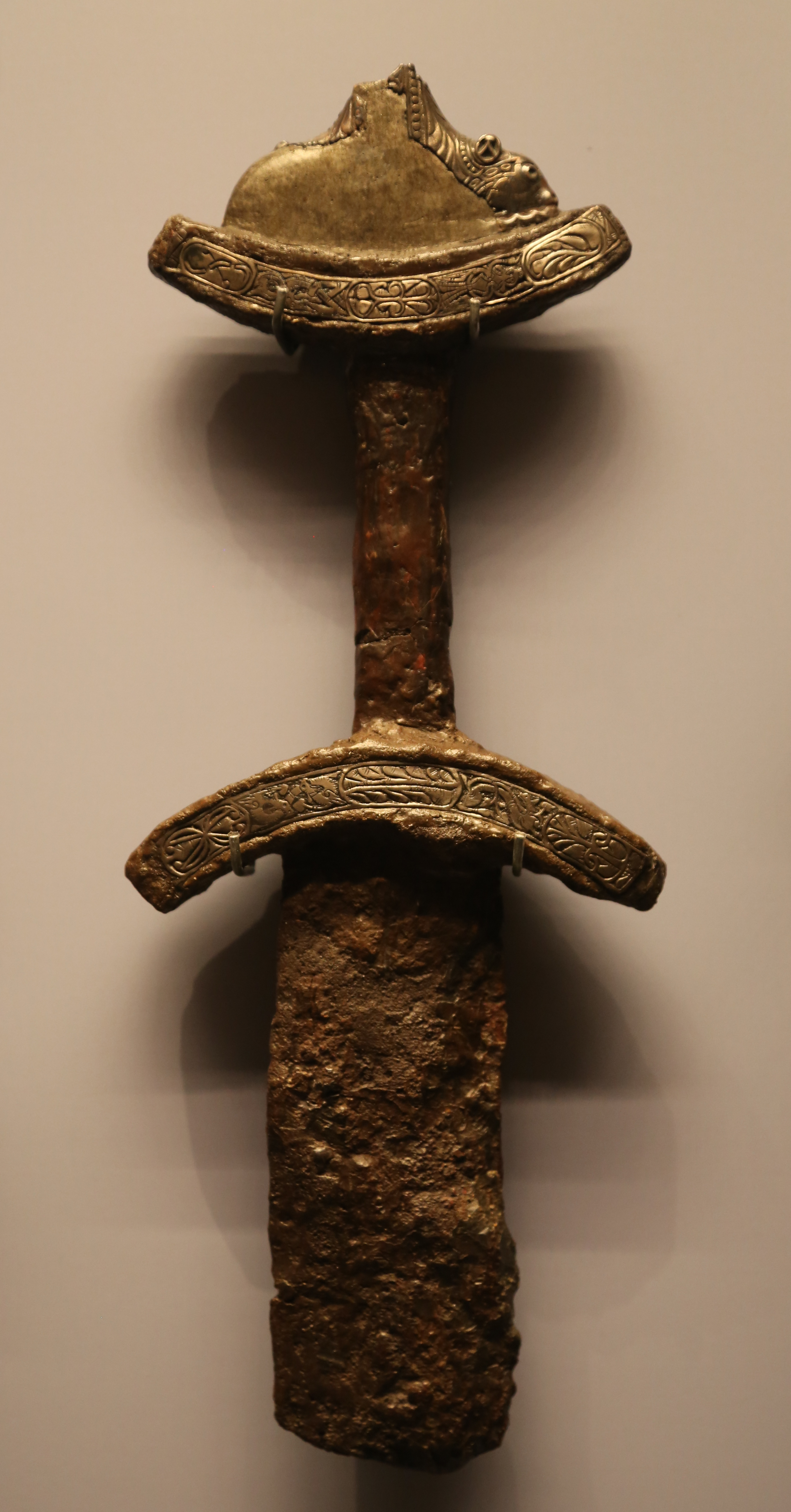
The Abingdon Sword

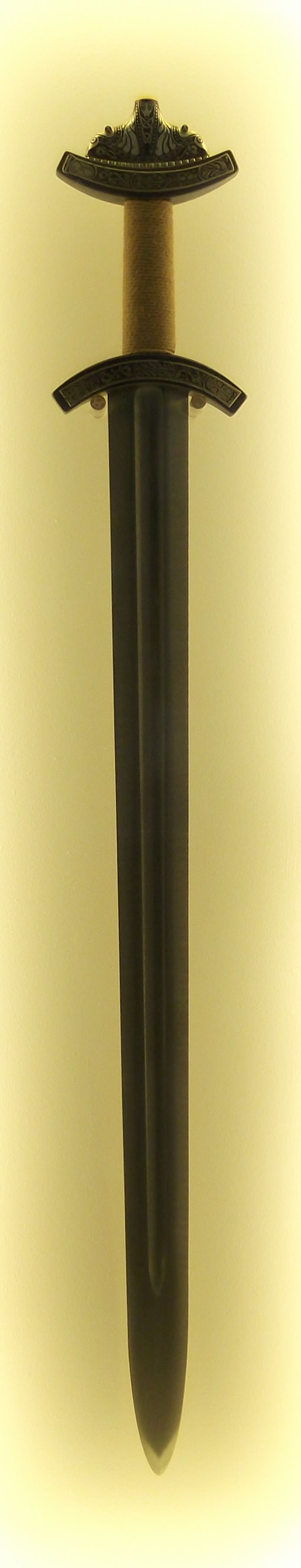
Reproduction of the Abingdon Sword on display at Abingdon County Hall Museum.

The Abingdon Sword is a late Anglo-Saxon iron sword and hilt believed to be from the late 9th or early 10th century; only the first few inches of the blade remain attached to the hilt.

The sword was found in 1874 at Bog Mill (possibly Buggs Mill, on the River Ock), near the town of Abingdon on the River Thames in Berkshire (now Oxfordshire) in England. It is held in the collection of the Ashmolean Museum in Oxford, north of Abingdon.

The Abingdon Sword has silver mounts inlaid with niello in the Trewhiddle style. The sword's guard has interlaced animal motifs. Ornamentation includes symbols of the Evangelists. The pommel of the sword has two animal heads for decoration.

A reproduction of the Abingdon Sword has been on display at Abingdon County Hall Museum since it reopened in 2012.

The style of the guards and pommel also suggest the sword dates from the late ninth to tenth century.

== Description ==
The upper and lower guards are curved and contain various interlaced designs, including birds, animal and human figures, and foliated patterns. The figures on the upper guard have been identified as the four symbols of the evangelists. The style of leaf used next to the figure of the eagle on the upper guard has also been identified on early tenth century embroideries from Durham. The Alfred Jewel and a number of other objects date to this period. The pommel incorporates two outward-looking animal heads, with protruding ears and round eyes and nostrils, now fragmentary.

The lower portion of the iron blade is missing, however X-rays of the sword show that the blade is pattern-welded.

== See also ==
- Abingdon Museum
- Abingdon Monks' Map
