= Sir Samuel Garrard, 4th Baronet =

English merchant and Tory politician

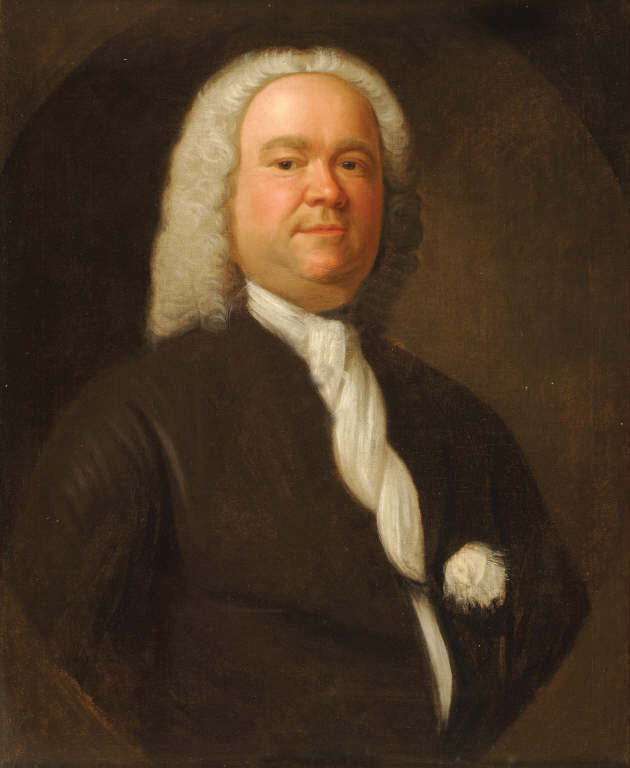
A portrait of Garrard by James Thornhill

Sir Samuel Garrard, 4th Baronet (c. 1650 – c. 1724) was an English merchant and Tory politician who sat in the English and British House of Commons between 1701 and 1710. He also served as Lord Mayor of London in 1709.

== Early life ==
Garrard was born in 1650, the second son of Sir John Garrard, 2nd baronet, and his wife Jane Lambard, daughter of Sir Moulton Lambard of Westcombe. He was a grandson of the first baronet Sir John Garrard, and maternal grandson of Dr. John Cosin, Bishop of Durham. His family were connected with the city of London for more than two centuries and intermarriages took place between the Garrards and the city families of Roe, Gresham, and Barkham. Two of his ancestors were Lord Mayors, Sir William Garrard in 1555, and Sir John Garrard in 1601.

Garrard carried on business as a merchant first in Watling Street and afterwards in Warwick Court, Newgate Street. He married Elizabeth Poyner, daughter of George Poyner of Codicote Bury, Hertfordshire on 16 October 1675. After she died without issue, he married as his second wife Jane Bennett, daughter of Thomas Bennett of Salthrop, Wiltshire on 22 January 1689. By the death, on 13 January 1700, of his brother Sir John Garrard, the third baronet, he succeeded to the baronetcy and the family estate of Lamer in Wheathamstead, Hertfordshire. He continued to reside and carry on business in London.

== Career ==
Garrard was elected alderman of the ward of Aldersgate on 3 March 1701. In 1701, after a contested election, he was appointed Sheriff of London and Middlesex. Garrard was returned as Tory Member of Parliament for Amersham on the Drake interest at a by-election on 10 March 1701. He was blacklisted for opposing preparations for war with France. He was not returned again for Amersham until a by-election on 14 November 1702. He voted for the Tack on 28 November 1704. He was returned in a contest at Amersham at the 1705 English general election and voted against the Court candidate for Speaker on 25 October 1705. At the 1708 British general election, he was returned unopposed as Tory MP for Amersham. He served the office of Lord Mayor in 1709–10. There was no pageant at his inauguration, the practice having been finally dropped after the mayoralty of his predecessor, Sir Charles Duncombe, for whom a pageant was prepared, but not exhibited on account of the death of Prince George of Denmark. At the beginning of his mayoralty, on 5 November 1709, Dr. Henry Sacheverell preached before him at St. Paul's his celebrated sermon advocating the doctrines of non-resistance and passive obedience, for which, and for an earlier sermon preached at Derby in August, he was impeached before the House of Lords. Garrard is said to have approved of the sermon and to have sanctioned its publication, but this he repudiated in the House of Commons when Sacheverell pleaded the encouragement of the Lord Mayor in mitigation of his offence. During the serious riots which followed this trial, Garrard exerted himself with much energy to restore order, and issued a proclamation, dated 30 March, prohibiting assemblies in the streets, the lighting of bonfires, and the sale of seditious books and pamphlets.

In October 1710 Garrard was chosen colonel of one of the regiments of the trained bands, and in the same year he became master of the Grocers' Company, of which he was a liveryman. However he did not stand for Parliament again at the 1710 British general election, probably as a result of his behaviour during the Sacheverell affair. In October 1720, he was chosen as president of Bridewell and Bethlehem Hospitals, and his portrait in full length, by an unknown artist, is preserved in the hall of Bridewell. Garrard was removed as Alderman to Bridge Ward Without in 1722, becoming senior alderman. He was also deputy-lieutenant of Hertfordshire.

== Death and legacy ==
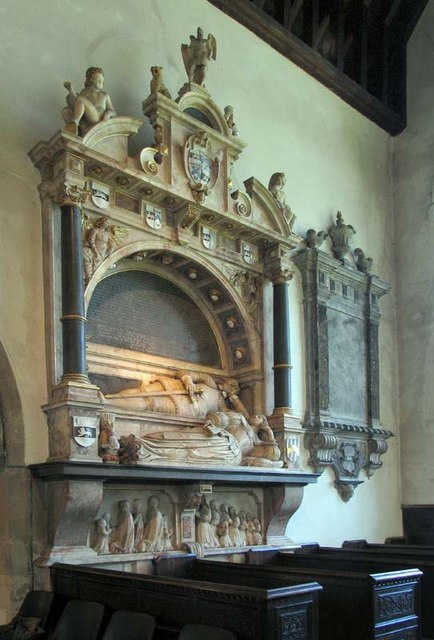
Garrard monument in St Helen's Church, Wheathampstead

Garrard died on 10 March 1724, and was buried in Wheathamstead Church, where a monument remains to his memory. By his second wife, Jane, he had five daughters and three surviving sons, Samuel (died 1761), who succeeded to the baronetcy; Thomas (died 1758), who became Common Serjeant of London; and Bennet (died 1767), who was Member of Parliament for Amersham and sixth and last baronet. His will, dated 20 December 1723, was proved in the P. C. C. on 1 April 1725. His property included estates in Exhall and Bedworth, Warwickshire; in Wheathamstead, Hertfordshire; and in the city of London; besides stock and annuities in the South Sea Company.

Parliament of England
Preceded by Viscount Newhaven; John Drake	Member of Parliament for Amersham; 1701–1701; With: John Drake	Succeeded by Viscount Newhaven; John Drake
Preceded by Viscount Newhaven; John Drake	Member of Parliament for Amersham; 1702–1707; With: John Drake 1702–1705, 1707; Viscount Newhaven 1705–1707	Succeeded by Parliament of Great Britain
Parliament of Great Britain
Preceded by Parliament of England	Member of Parliament for Amersham; 1707–1710; With: John Drake 1707–1708; Francis Duncombe 1708–1710	Succeeded by John Drake; Francis Duncombe
Civic offices
Preceded by Sir Charles Duncombe	Lord Mayor of London; 1709–1710	Succeeded by Sir Gilbert Heathcote, 1st Baronet
Baronetage of England
Preceded by John Garrard	Baronet (of Lamer); 1700–1724	Succeeded by Sir Samuel Garrard
