= Francis Duncombe =

English politician

Francis Duncombe (c. 1653–1720), of Broughton, Newport Pagnell, Buckinghamshire, was an English Tory politician who sat in the House of Commons from 1708 to 1713.

== Early life ==
Duncombe was the eldest son of Thomas Duncombe of Broughton and his first wife Mary Edmonds, daughter of Charles Edmonds of Preston, Northamptonshire. In 1672, he succeeded to the estates of his father. He married Mary Chester, daughter of Sir Anthony Chester, 3rd Baronet, MP, of Chicheley, Buckinghamshire on 26 April 1683. She died in 1686 and he married as his second wife by licence dated 13 February 1688, Frances Baron, daughter of James Baron, linen-draper and alderman of London. He was a deputy-lieutenant and JP of the Buckinghamshire in 1684. Around 1702, when his wife inherited money from her uncle, he acquired the manor of North Crawley, near Newport Pagnell which gave him electoral interest.

== Career ==
Duncombe stood unsuccessfully for Buckinghamshire at a by-election in 1704. At the 1708 British general election he was returned as Tory Member of Parliament (MP) for Amersham. On 23 December 1708, he was named to the drafting committee on the bill to improve army recruitment. He also voted against the impeachment of Dr Sacheverell in 1710. However with other Duncombes in the House, it is impossible to distinguish some of his contributions. He was returned again at the 1710 British general election and was listed as a ‘Tory patriot’ who opposed the continuation of the war, a ‘worthy patriot’ who helped to detect the mismanagements of the previous administration, and a member of the October Club. On 2 May 1713, he told in favour of a bill suspending the duties on French wines, which was an essential prerequisite for the French commerce bill, which he voted for on 18 June. In May 1713, he presented the Amersham address to the Queen on the ‘glorious peace’. He did not stand at the 1713 British general election.

== Later life and legacy ==
In September 1714, Duncombe was a signatory to an agreement to split the Buckinghamshire representation between a Whig and a Tory, in preparation for the expected general election. It was said he was omitted from the Buckinghamshire bench in February 1716.

Duncombe died on 31 January 1720. His daughter by his first marriage predeceased him, and he had a son and daughter by his second marriage.

Parliament of Great Britain
Preceded by Sir Samuel Garrard, Bt; John Drake	Member of Parliament for Amersham; 1708–1713; With: Sir Samuel Garrard, Bt 1708-1710; John Drake	Succeeded by Montague Garrard Drake; The 1st Viscount Fermanagh
