= Baptist Leveson-Gower =

British Tory politician

Baptist Leveson-Gower (3 April 1703 – 4 August 1782) was a British Tory politician who sat in the House of Commons for 34 years from 1727 to 1761.

Leveson-Gower was the fourth son of John Leveson Gower, 1st Baron Gower, MP, and his wife Lady Catherine Manners, daughter of John Manners, 1st Duke of Rutland. He entered Westminster School in May 1717, aged 13 and was admitted at St. John’s College, Cambridge on 22 April 1720, aged 16.

At the 1727 British general election Leveson-Gower was returned as a Tory Member of Parliament at both Amersham and Newcastle-Under-Lyme, and chose to sit for Newcastle-under-Lyme on his family’s interest. He voted consistently against the Government. He was returned for Newcastle-under-Lyme in a contest at the 1734 British general election and unopposed at the 1741 British general election. In December 1744 his brother, Lord Gower, joined the Administration, and he was appointed a Lord of Trade in 1745. He was returned again in 1747 and resigned his office in June 1749. He became a member of the Duke of Bedford’s circle and in 1751 he split from Lord Gower and went into opposition with Bedford.

Leveson-Gower was returned at the 1754 British general election and was classed as a member of the Bedford group, then in opposition. He did not stand in 1761.

Leveson-Gower died unmarried in 1782. He was the brother of Hon. Thomas and William Leveson-Gower.

Parliament of Great Britain
Preceded by Thomas Chapman; The 2nd Viscount Fermanagh	Member of Parliament for Amersham; 1727–1728; With: Montague Garrard Drake	Succeeded by Montague Garrard Drake; Thomas Lutwyche
Preceded by Sir Walter Bagot; Thomas Leveson-Gower	Member of Parliament for Newcastle-Under-Lyme; 1727–1761; With: John Ward 1727-1734; John Lawton 1734-1740; Randle Wilbraham 1740-1747; Viscount Parker 1747-1754; John Waldegrave 1754-1761	Succeeded by Henry Vernon; John Waldegrave
