= Sir William Drake, 1st Baronet =

English lawyer and politician

Sir William Drake, 1st Baronet (28 September 1606 – 28 August 1669) of Shardeloes, near Amersham, Buckinghamshire was an English lawyer and politician who sat in the House of Commons between 1640 and 1648 and again from 1661 to 1669.

== Life ==
Drake was the son of Francis Drake of Esher, and his wife Joan Tothill, daughter of William Tothill of Shardeloes, Buckinghamshire. He studied under Charles Croke. He then went to Christ Church, Oxford in 1624, where he befriended John Gregory, and was tutored by George Morley. In 1626 he went to the Middle Temple, where his cousin John White was also called to the bar; in that year he inherited the Shardeloes estate from his mother's side of the family.

Drake's father died in 1633, leaving his son Esher which was sold. In 1637 he purchased the manor of Amersham, which his father had represented in Parliament during the 1620s. At around the same time he bought office in the Court of Common Pleas. He was later (1652) a chirographer (the officer responsible for noting final concords and filing records of fines) to the court.

In April 1640, Drake was elected member of parliament for Amersham in the Short Parliament. He was knighted on 15 July 1641 and created baronet, of Shardeloes on 17 July 1641. He was re-elected to Amersham in 1641 in the Long Parliament and was excluded in Pride's Purge in 1648. The exclusion was nominal, however: Drake was very unwilling to come off the fence at the beginning of the First English Civil War, and in 1643 applied for leave to travel abroad. He was out of the country for most of the period to 1660. He was re-elected for Amersham in 1661 and held the seat until his death.

Drake died unmarried at the age of 63 and his estates passed to his nephew Sir William Drake.

== Legacy ==
A collection of commonplace books was discovered at Shardloes in 1643, but was first identified with William Tothill, who had served as steward to Francis Bacon. As such they were purchased by C. K. Ogden, who left them to University College London. They were identified as Drake's in 1976. With other materials from the collections, manuscripts that have been identified subsequently, and some of Drake's books that have survived with annotations, Sharpe has called Drake's legacy "the greatest archival resource we have to chart how an early modern English gentleman read".

Parliament of England
Vacant Parliament suspended since 1629	Member of Parliament for Amersham; 1640; With: Edmund Waller	Succeeded by Francis Drake; William Cheyney
Preceded by Francis Drake; William Cheyney	Member of Parliament for Amersham; 1641–1648; With: Francis Drake	Constituency not represented until 1659
Preceded by Charles Cheyne; Thomas Proby	Member of Parliament for Amersham; 1661–1669; With: Thomas Proby	Succeeded by Sir William Drake; Sir Thomas Proby, 1st Baronet
Baronetage of England
New creation	Baronet (of Shardeloes); 1641–1669	Extinct
