= William Tyrwhitt-Drake =

- c. 1815 portrait

Member of Parliament for Amersham
- In office 21 November 1810 – 10 December 1832

Personal details
- Born: 21 October 1785
- Died: 21 December 1848 (aged 63)
- Party: Tory
- Parent: Thomas Drake Tyrwhitt-Drake (father)

William Tyrwhitt-Drake (21 October 1785 – 21 December 1848) was a British Member of Parliament (MP) for Amersham from 1810 to 1832.

William Tyrwhitt-Drake fought at the Battle of Waterloo and served in parliament alongside his brother Thomas Tyrwhitt-Drake.

== See also ==
- List of MPs elected in the 1831 United Kingdom general election
- List of MPs elected in the 1830 United Kingdom general election
- List of MPs elected in the 1826 United Kingdom general election
- List of MPs elected in the 1820 United Kingdom general election
- List of MPs elected in the 1818 United Kingdom general election
- List of MPs elected in the 1812 United Kingdom general election
- List of MPs elected in the 1807 United Kingdom general election
