= Thomas Drake Tyrwhitt-Drake =

British politician

Captain Thomas Drake Tyrwhitt-Drake (January 14, 1749 – October 18, 1810) born Thomas Drake, later Thomas Drake Tyrwhitt, was a British Member of Parliament for Amersham from 1795-1810.

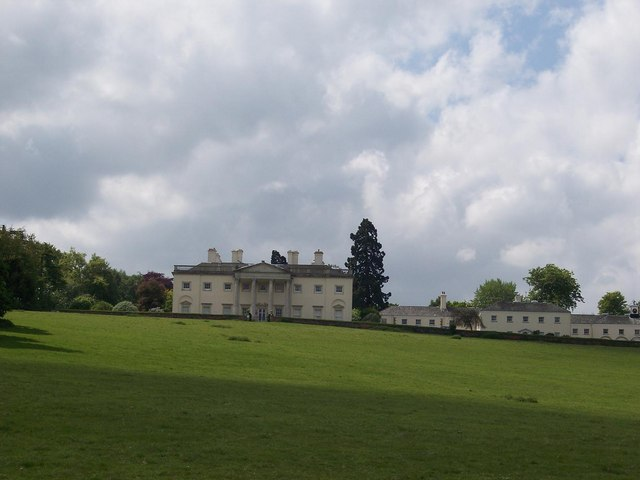
Shardeloes - the Drake family seat

== Early life and family ==
Thomas Drake was born on 14 January 1749 the second but oldest surviving son of William Drake, MP for Amersham from 1746 to 1796, and his wife Elizabeth, daughter of John Raworth of London. He was educated at Westminster School and Brasenose College, Oxford. His elder brother was William Drake, who predeceased their father. Thomas adopted the surname Tyrwhitt in 1776 in order to inherit the estates of his cousin Sir John de la Fountain Tyrwhitt, 6th Baronet, and then the additional surname of Drake in 1796 when his father died.

He married, on 8 August 1780, Anne Wickham, a daughter of the Rev. William Wickham of Garsington, Oxfordshire. The Rev. Wickham was the proprietor of the manor of Garsington and, when he died, 1770, the estates passed to Anne; when she married Tyrwhitt-Drake, they entered his family and remained part of its estate until it was sold in 1914 to Philip Morrell. Together, they had five sons and three daughters:

- Captain Thomas Tyrwhitt-Drake (1783 - 1852) was a Member of Parliament for Amersham from 1805 to 1832.
- William Tyrwhitt-Drake (1785 - 1848) was a Member of Parliament for Amersham from 1810 to 1832.
- Reverend John Tyrwhitt-Drake, Rector of Amersham, married Mary Annesley, third daughter of Arthur Annesley of Bletchingdon, Oxfordshire. He married secondly Emily Drake-Garrard, fifth daughter of Charles Drake Garrard.
- Reverend George Tyrwhitt-Drake, Rector of Malpas, Cheshire. He married Jane Halsey, second daughter of Joseph Halsey of Gaddesden.
- Frederick William Tyrwhitt-Drake.
- Mary Frances Tyrwhitt-Drake.
- Anne Tyrwhitt-Drake. She married Hugh Richard Hoare, of Lillingstone, Buckinghamshire.
- Louisa Isabella Tyrwhitt-Drake. She married the Rev. John Anthony Partridge, rector of Cranwich, Norfolk.

He held the post of Sheriff of Glamorganshire for the year 1786-7 and was commissioned into the Amersham Volunteer Infantry as a Captain in 1798.

== Member of Parliament ==
The borough of Amersham was a "Rotten Borough" in which a leading family, here the Drakes, controlled the seat and could effectively choose who the borough's two Members of Parliament were. Since 1790, William Drake and his son, also called William, were the two Members; however, in 1795, the younger William died and so Tyrwhitt-Drake, being the next younger son, filled his vacant seat. A year later, the elder William resigned his seat and died shortly afterwards. He is buried in Amersham with a monument by John Bacon.

He was largely a supporter of the administration of William Pitt the Younger, and did not oppose that of Henry Addington. He was considered less reliable in 1804 and voted to have Lord Melville prosecuted the following year. He went on to vote with ministers in 1810. He is not known to have spoken in the House. He died before the end of Parliament, on 18 October 1810, and his son, William Tyrwhitt filled his seat (his older son, Thomas, having been a Member since 1805).

Parliament of the United Kingdom
Preceded by William Drake I William Drake II	Member of Parliament for Amersham; 1795 – 1810; With: William Drake I (1795–1796); Charles Drake Garrard (1796–1805); Thomas Tyrwhitt-Drake (1805–1810)	Succeeded by Thomas Tyrwhitt-Drake; William Tyrwhitt-Drake
