= John Blacknall =

- Born: 1583
- Died: 21 August 1625

John Blacknall (1583 – 21 August 1625) was a landowner and benefactor to Abingdon-on-Thames.

== Early life and education ==
He was born in 1583, son of William Jr. His grandfather William Sr. was a wealthy landowner and owner of the Abbey mills. William Sr. had originally bought the Abbey land after the Dissolution of the Monasteries.

He is believed to have been educated at John Roysse's Free School in Abingdon, (now Abingdon School) and later studied at The Queen's College, Oxford.

== Career ==
He was a barrister-at-law and qualified from Middle Temple but decided not to practice. His grandfather died in 1585 and when his father died in 1613 he inherited the estate. He married a daughter of a gentry family (the Blagraves of Bulmershe) and had little interest in the business selling the mills but continued to acquire more land.

It is believed that the Blacknall family (and possibly John) commissioned the Abingdon Monks' Map and Blacknall Map.

== Death and legacy ==
He died of the plague on 21 August 1625 and has a Monument with effigies in St Nicolas Church, Abingdon. By his will dated 9 August 1625 he bequeathed 40 shillings per annum for the schoolmaster of Abingdon School. He left £16,000 (a fortune at the time) to his daughter Mary Blacknall.

== See also ==
- List of Old Abingdonians
