= Thomas Gore (MP) =

British politician

Thomas Gore (c. 1694–1777) of Dunstan Park, Berkshire, was a British politician who sat in the House of Commons between 1722 and 1768.

== Early life ==
Gore was the third son of Sir William Gore Lord Mayor of London and his wife, Elizabeth Hampton. He was admitted at Inner Temple in 1711, and matriculated at Christ Church, Oxford on 4 June 1714, aged 19. He married Mary Humfreys, twice-widowed daughter of Sir William Humfreys, 1st Baronet of London on 15 September 1748. Her former husbands were William Ball Waring, and John Honywood.

== Career ==
Gore stood for Parliament at Cricklade at a by-election in 1721 when he was unsuccessful, but was returned as Tory Member of Parliament for Cricklade on the interest of his elder brother, William, at the 1722 general election. He lost his seat at Cricklade, being defeated at the 1727 general election and was out of Parliament for several years.

Gore was returned at Amersham on 17 February 1735, on the Drake interest. He spoke on the gin bill in 1736 and on the quartering of troops in 1741. He was among the Tories who voted against the motion for Walpole's removal in February 1741. At the 1741 general election, he was returned again for Amersham. He continued in opposition, signing the opposition whip of November 1743, but went over to the Administration at the end of 1744 as one of Lord Gower's followers. He spoke in favour of the vote of credit in March 1745 and supported the address of thanks on the Hessians on 3 December. In 1746 he was rewarded with a place as Muster-master general which he held for the rest of his life, but at the consequent by-election in February 1746, his Amersham seat was taken by William Drake, However, the government provided him with a seat at Portsmouth where he was returned on 3 March. 1746. After taking office, Gore supported every Administration in turn. He was re-elected for Portsmouth at the 1747 general election and also at Bedford on the interest of the Duke of Bedford. He chose to sit for Bedford.

Gore was returned again for Cricklade at the 1754 general election. He is not recorded as speaking in the House during this period. In 1761 he was mentioned as a candidate for Speaker, but Newcastle considered him to be ‘too old and infirm’. He survived a contest at Cricklade in 1761, but retired at the general election of 1768.

== Death ==
Gore died without issue on 17 March 1777. His brothers of John and William Gore were also MPs.

Parliament of Great Britain
| Preceded by Sir Thomas Reade; Hon. Matthew Ducie Moreton | Member of Parliament for Cricklade; 1722–1727; With: Sir Thomas Reade | Succeeded by Sir Thomas Reade; Christopher Tilson |
| Preceded by Sir Henry Marshall; Thomas Lutwyche | Member of Parliament for Amersham; 1735–1746; With: Sir Henry Marshall | Succeeded by Sir Henry Marshall; William Drake, Sr |
| Preceded by Martin Bladen; Isaac Townsend | Member of Parliament for Portsmouth; 1746–1747; With: Isaac Townsend | Succeeded by Hon. Edward Legge; Isaac Townsend |
| Preceded by Samuel Ongley; Sir Boteler Chernock, 4th Baronet | Member of Parliament for Bedford; 1747–1754; With: John Offley | Succeeded by Francis Herne; Robert Henley-Ongley |
| Preceded by William Rawlinson Earle; Lieutenant-Colonel John Gore | Member of Parliament for Cricklade; 1754–1768; With: William Rawlinson Earle 1754-1761; Arnold Nesbitt 1761-1768 | Succeeded by Hon. George Damer; Lieutenant-Colonel Sir Robert Fletcher |
