= William Hakewill =

English antiquarian and politician (1574–1655)

William Hakewill (1574–1655) was an English legal antiquarian and M.P.

== Life ==
Born in Exeter, Devon, son of John Hakewill and his wife Thomasine (née Periam). Educated, according to Anthony Wood at Exeter College, Oxford (though he did not take a degree), he later studied law at Lincoln's Inn.

Hakewill became Member of Parliament for Bossiney in Cornwall in 1601, probably nominated for the seat by its patron, his maternal uncle Sir William Peryam, Lord Chief Baron of the Exchequer. Though a tyro MP Hakewill was active and spoke out against the excessive granting of monopolies. He also delivered speeches against allowing the export of ordnance to Spain and in favour of keeping a strong navy.

Hakewill was called to the bar in 1606, was a Bencher of Lincoln's Inn by 1616 and Lent Reader in 1625. Described by the antiquarian Anthony Wood as "a grave and judicious counsellor" but "always a puritan", Hakewill was a friend of William Prynne and an associate of John Selden whose critical views on the royal prerogative he shared.

Despite his puritan connections Hakewill was appointed Solicitor General to Queen Anne, the wife of James I in 1617. Unfortunately she died in 1619 and his benefactor Sir Francis Bacon was disgraced in 1621.

Hakewill was part of the attempt in 1614 to revive the Elizabethan "College of Antiquaries", in some ways a precursor of the Society of Antiquaries; a friend of Sir Robert Cotton, a kinsman and executor of Sir Thomas Bodley and the elder brother of the author and divine George Hakewill. In 1617 he married Elizabeth Woodhouse, a daughter of Sir Henry Woodhouse of Waxham, Norfolk, by his second wife Cecily Gresham. Her elder half-sister Ann was the third wife of Sir Julius Caesar, Master of the Rolls, to whom Hakewill addressed gratulatory Latin verses (now in the British Library).

Although originally elected to parliament for Cornish seats (Bossiney in 1601, Michell in 1604–11, and Tregony in 1614 and 1621–2) he sat in the parliaments of 1624 and 1628/9 for Amersham in Bucks. As a result of his researches three Buckinghamshire boroughs were re-enfranchised in 1624 (Wendover, Amersham and Marlow). Hakewill was elected as one of Amersham's two MP's and his distant relative the famous John Hampden was elected for Wendover.

He leased Chequers (now the country home of British Prime Ministers) near Ellesborough in 1619. In the latter part of his life Hakewill lived at The Hale in Wendover, Buckinghamshire and was survived by at least two sons, William and Robert. His will left instructions that expenditure on his funeral was not to exceed £40. He is buried in the Church at Wendover under a commemorative stone that still survives.

== Works ==
He published The Liberty of the Subject against the pretended Power of Impositions (1641), The manner how Statutes are enacted in Parliament by Passing of Bills(1641) and Modus tenendi Parliamentum; or, the old Manner of holding Parliaments in England(1659).
