= Richard Lowther (died 1703) =

English landowner

Richard Lowther (1638–1703), English landowner at Maulds Meaburn, was the second son of Sir John Lowther, 1st Baronet, and Mary Fletcher.

He received the estate at Maulds Meaburn from his father, and was member of parliament for Appleby from 1689 to 1690.

Lowther married Barbara Prickett and had two sons:

- Richard Lowther (1692–1721)
- Robert Lowther (1681–1745), Governor of Barbados

Parliament of England
Preceded by Sackville Tufton; Philip Musgrave	Member of Parliament for Appleby; 1689–1690; With: Philip Musgrave 1689; William Cheyne 1689–90	Succeeded by William Cheyne; Hon. Charles Boyle
