= Thomas Chapman (MP) =

British lawyer and Tory politician

Thomas Chapman (born 1663) of Caldecote, Buckinghamshire was a British lawyer and Tory politician who sat in the House of Commons between 1710 and 1727.

Chapman was baptized on 20 April 1663, the eldest son of Roger Chapman, attorney of Caldecote and his first wife. Rebecca Catesby, probably daughter of Thomas Catesby of Hardmead, Buckinghamshire. He matriculated at Christ Church, Oxford on 5 December 1679 aged 16 and was admitted at Inner Temple in 1680. He married by licence dated 17 July 1682, Elizabeth Goodman of St. Andrew, Holborn. In 1687, he was called to the bar. As Captain Thomas Chapman, he helped to raise the Buckinghamshire militia and in November 1688 marched with them to Northampton to meet William of Orange's forces under Lord Grey of Ruthin. In 1703 he succeeded to the estates of his father and became a Deputy Lieutenant and Justice of the Peace for Buckinghamshire.but was disappointed that his actions during the Revolution had not been rewarded.

Chapman was elected as Tory Member of Parliament for Buckingham at the 1710 general election. He was very active in Parliament, drafting legislation and managing bills through Parliament. He was elected for Buckingham again in 1713 and continued to be an active Member of Parliament. In 1715 he was defeated at Buckingham. He was brought in by Montague Garrard Drake for Amersham at a by-election on 27 October 1722, but there in no record of his having voted, and he did not stand at the 1727 general election.

Chapman sold Caldecote in 1744. It is not known when he died but he left three surviving sons, and three surviving daughters. Browne Willis described him as ‘an excellent justice of the peace, but squandered his estate’,

Parliament of Great Britain
Preceded by Sir Richard Temple, 4th Bt. Alexander Denton	Member of Parliament for Buckingham; 1710–1715; With: Sir Richard Temple, 4th Bt. 1710-1713; John Radcliffe 1713-1715	Succeeded by Alexander Denton; Abraham Stanyan
Preceded by Montague Garrard Drake; The 2nd Viscount Fermanagh	Member of Parliament for Amersham; 1722–1727; With: The 2nd Viscount Fermanagh	Succeeded by Montague Garrard Drake; Baptist Leveson-Gower
