= Thomas Lutwyche =

English lawyer and Tory politician

Thomas Lutwyche (baptised 1675 – 1734) of the Inner Temple and Lutwyche Hall, Shropshire, was an English lawyer and Tory politician who sat in the House of Commons almost continuously from 1710 to 1734.

== Life ==
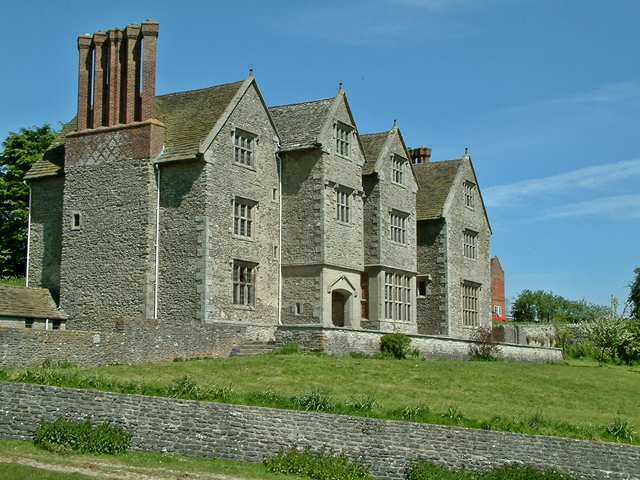
Wilderhope Manor, Wenlock Edge

Lutwyche was the son of Sir Edward Lutwyche, Justice of the Common Pleas, and his wife Anne Tourneur, daughter of Sir Timothy Tourneur. He was a scholar at Westminster School, and was elected to Christ Church, Oxford, where he matriculated 4 July 1692, but took no degree.

Lutwyche was called to the bar at the Inner Temple in 1697. He was reader there in 1715, and treasurer of the inn in 1722.

Lutwyche was reluctant to enter politics, and did so in the end with the backing of Thomas Tufton, 6th Earl of Thanet. He was elected Member of Parliament for Appleby at the 1710 and 1713 general elections in fiercely competed contests. At the 1715 general election he was returned unopposed for Appleby. He was elected MP for Callington at the 1722 general election, probably with the support of Sir John Coryton, but did not stand in 1727. However he was then returned as MP for Amersham on the Drake interest at a by-election on 23 February 1728 and was re-elected there at the 1734 general election.

A High Tory, Lutwyche was made Q.C. in 1710. He rejected an offer from Robert Harley to become a judge, in 1711. He delivered on 6 November 1723 a speech in parliament against the bill for taxing Catholics.

At the end of his life, in 1734, Lutwyche bought Wilderhope Manor from Thomas Smalman. He died on 13 November 1734, and was buried in the Inner Temple Church.

== Works ==
Lutwyche left some manuscript law reports from the Queen's Bench. They were published in 1781, in pt. xi. of Modern Reports.

== Family ==
Lutwyche married Elizabeth Bagnall, daughter of William Bagnall of Bretforton and had 2 sons and 3 daughters. Their daughter Anne married Nicholas Fazakerley; their third daughter Sarah married Thomas Geers (died 1753), Member of Parliament for Hereford.

== Notes ==
Parliament of Great Britain
Preceded by Nicholas Lechmere; Edward Duncombe	Member of Parliament for Appleby; 1710–1722; With: Edward Duncombe 1710–1713; Sir Richard Sandford, Bt. 1713–1722	Succeeded by Sackville Tufton; Sir Richard Sandford, Bt.
Preceded by Thomas Coplestone; Sir John Coryton, 4th Baronet	Member of Parliament for Callington; 1722 – 1727; With: Thomas Coplestone	Succeeded by Thomas Coplestone; Sir John Coryton, 4th Baronet
Preceded by Montague Garrard Drake; Baptist Leveson-Gower	Member of Parliament for Amersham; 1728–1734; With: Montague Garrard Drake 1728; Marmaduke Alington 1728–1734; Sir Henry Marshall 1734	Succeeded by Sir Henry Marshall; Thomas Gore
