= Ralph Verney, 1st Earl Verney =

Ralph Verney, 1st Earl Verney (18 March 1683 – 4 October 1752), of Middle Claydon, near Buckingham, Buckinghamshire, known as The Viscount Fermanagh until 1742, was initially a Tory and later a Whig politician who sat in the House of Commons in two phases between 1717 and 1752.

== Early life ==
Verney was born at Little Chelsea, the only surviving son of John Verney, 1st Viscount Fermanagh and his first wife Elizabeth Palmer, the eldest daughter of Ralph Palmer, and was baptised in Kensington. He was educated at Mrs Morland's school at Hackney from around 1695 to 1700 and matriculated at Merton College, Oxford in 1700. He married Catherine Paschall, eldest daughter of Henry Paschall of Baddow, Essex at St Giles in the Fields on 24 February 1708.

== Career ==
Verney succeeded his father as viscount and took his seat in the Irish House of Lords on 23 June 1717. The latter title was in the Peerage of Ireland and thus didn't prevent him from entering the British House of Commons. He was returned unopposed as Tory Member of Parliament for Amersham at a by-election on 10 July 1717. In 1719, he voted against the repeal of the Occasional Conformity and Schism Acts and the Peerage Bill. At the 1722 British general election, he was returned again unopposed as MP for Amersham. He did not stand at the 1727 British general election, by which time he was described as ‘being unconcerned for any party’.

Verney did not sit in parliament for several years, but began to develop an electoral interest at Wendover. At the 1741 British general election he was elected MP for Wendover as a Whig. He voted consistently with the Administration and was created Earl Verney, in the Province of Leinster in 1743. He was returned unopposed for Wendover at the 1747 British general election.

== Family ==
Verney's wife died in 1748 and Verney survived her by four years, dying at Little Chelsea on 4 October 1752. They were both buried in Middle Claydon. The couple had two sons and two daughters. The older son John predeceased him in 1737 and he was succeeded in his titles by his second son Ralph. John's daughter Mary was raised to the Peerage in her own right in 1792.

== Notes ==
Parliament of Great Britain
Preceded by The Viscount Fermanagh; Montague Garrard Drake	Member of Parliament for Amersham; 1717–1727; With: Montague Garrard Drake 1717–1722; Thomas Chapman 1722–1727	Succeeded by Montague Garrard Drake; Baptist Leveson-Gower
Preceded by The Viscount Limerick; John Hampden	Member of Parliament for Wendover; 1741–1752; With: John Hampden	Succeeded by The 2nd Earl of Verney; John Hampden
Peerage of Ireland
New creation	Earl Verney; 1742–1752	Succeeded by Ralph Verney
Preceded by John Verney	Viscount Fermanagh; 1717–1752	Succeeded by Ralph Verney
