= John Lawton (died 1740) =

British Member of Parliament

John Lawton (c.1700 – 7 June 1740) was a British Member of Parliament (MP).

He was elected at the 1734 general election as an MP for Newcastle-under-Lyme, and held the seat until his death in 1740.

Parliament of the United Kingdom
Preceded by John Ward; Baptist Leveson-Gower	Member of Parliament for Newcastle-under-Lyme; 1734–1740; With: Baptist Leveson-Gower	Succeeded by Randle Wilbraham; Baptist Leveson-Gower
