= John Verney, 1st Viscount Fermanagh =

English peer, merchant and Tory politician

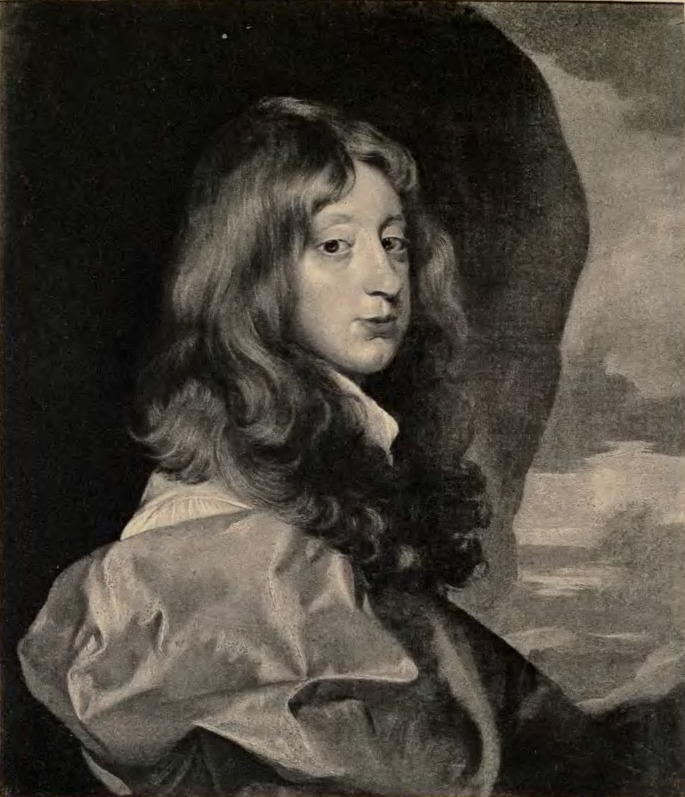
- portrait by Gerard Soest
- Born: 5 November 1640
- Died: 23 June 1717 (aged 76)
- Occupation: Politician
- Spouse(s): Elizabeth Palmer, Mary Lawley, Elizabeth Baker
- Children: Ralph Verney, 1st Earl Verney, Margaret Verney, Mary Verney
- Parent(s): Sir Ralph Verney, 1st Baronet, of Middle Claydon; Mary Blacknall

John Verney, 1st Viscount Fermanagh (5 November 1640 – 23 June 1717), known as Sir John Verney, 2nd Baronet, between 1696 and 1703, was an English peer, merchant and Tory politician who sat in the House of Commons from 1710 to 1717.

== Early life ==
Verney was the second and only surviving son of Sir Ralph Verney, 1st Baronet, and his wife Mary Blacknall, daughter of John Blacknall. He accompanied his father into his French exile, aged eight, and was educated at Blois for the following five years. After the family's return to England, he joined James Fleetwood's school at Barn Elms and in 1655 went to another school in Kensington. Thereafter Verney worked for a Levant merchant, making expeditions to Mesopotamia and Cyprus. On 27 May 1680, he married Elizabeth Palmer, daughter of Ralph Palmer, at Westminster Abbey After her death in 1686, Verney married a second time to Mary Lawley, daughter of Sir Francis Lawley, 2nd Baronet, on 10 July 1692, also at Westminster Abbey. She died in childbed only two years later and their newborn son shortly thereafter. Verney married as his third wife Elizabeth Baker, daughter of his neighbour Daniel Baker, on 8 April 1696 at Kensington. In 1696, he succeeded his father as baronet.

== Career ==
Verney was several years assistant to the Royal African Company and served as governor of Bethlem Royal Hospital. He contested the county of Buckinghamshire in the elections of 1696 and 1698 and the town of Buckingham in 1701; each time unsuccessfully. On 16 June 1703, Verney was created Viscount of the County of Fermanagh along with the subsidiary title Baron Verney of Belturbet, in the County of Cavan. Both titles were in the Peerage of Ireland and hence didn't prevent him being returned as member of parliament for Buckinghamshire at the 1710 general election. He was returned again for Buckinghamshire in 1713. At the 1715 general election he was returned unopposed instead as MP for Amersham on the Drake interest and represented it until his death in 1717.

== Death and legacy ==
The Viscount Fermanagh died aged 76 and was buried in Middle Claydon in Buckinghamshire a week later. He had by his first wife, a son and three daughters. He was succeeded in his titles by his only surviving son Ralph.

Parliament of Great Britain
Preceded by Richard Hampden; Sir Edmund Denton, Bt	Member of Parliament for Buckinghamshire; 1710–1715; With: Sir Edmund Denton, Bt 1710–1713; John Fleetwood 1713–1715	Succeeded by John Fleetwood; Richard Hampden
Preceded by John Drake; Francis Duncombe	Member of Parliament for Amersham; 1715–1717; With: Montague Garrard Drake	Succeeded by The Viscount Fermanagh; Montague Garrard Drake
Peerage of Ireland
New creation	Viscount Fermanagh; 1703–1717	Succeeded by Ralph Verney
Baronetage of England
Preceded by Ralph Verney	Baronet (of Middle Claydon); 1696–1717	Succeeded by Ralph Verney
