= Garrard =

Garrard may refer to:

- Garrard (surname)
- Garrard (automobile)
- Garrard, Kentucky
- Garrard County, Kentucky

== See also ==
- Garrard Engineering and Manufacturing Company
- Garrard & Co, jewellery company
