= Mary Blacknall =

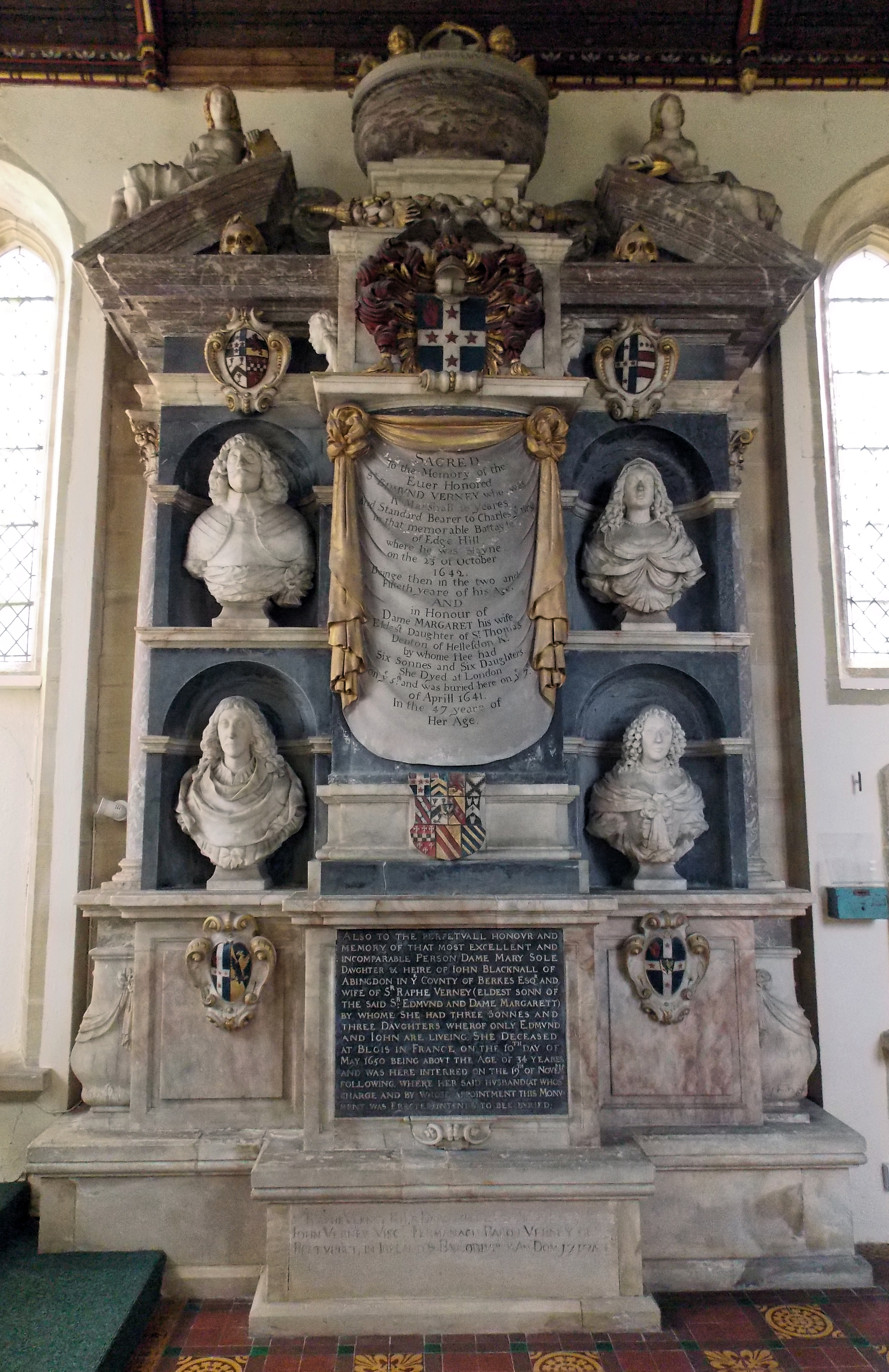
- Memorial to the Verney family, including Mary Blacknall (bottom right), in the church next to Claydon House
- Born: 1616
- Died: 10 May 1650 (aged 33–34); Blois
- Spouse: Sir Ralph Verney, 1st Baronet, of Middle Claydon
- Children: 6, including John Verney, 1st Viscount Fermanagh
- Father: John Blacknall

Mary Verney (née Blacknall, 1616 – 10 May 1650) was the wife of Sir Ralph Verney, 1st Baronet, of Middle Claydon DL, JP (1613–1696), an English baronet and politician who sat in the House of Commons.

Mary Blacknall was the daughter of John Blacknall, a mill-owner, of Wasing and Abingdon, Berkshire. She came from a wealthy family and was christened on 19 February 1616 in Abingdon. On 31 May 1629, aged c.13, Mary Blacknall married Ralph Verney, aged 15, of the Verney family in Hillesden, Buckinghamshire. Despite the early marriage, it was a happy one. Ralph and Mary Verney had three sons and three daughters at Claydon House in Buckinghamshire:

1. Mary Verney (21 July 1632 – 22 July 1632)
2. Anna Maria Verney (16 September 1634 – 22 May 1638)
3. Edmund Verney, Esquire (25 December 1636 – 4 September 1688)
  - Married Mary Abel (1641-1715) in 1662
4. Margaret Verney (8 January 1639 – 3 October 1647)
5. John Verney, 1st Viscount Fermanagh (5 November 1640 – 23 June 1717)
6. Ralph Verney (3 June 1647 – before 3 October 1647)

Mary Verney died on 10 May 1650 in Blois, Loir-et-Cher, France, where she accompanied her husband while he was in exile. She was buried at Middle Claydon on 19 November 1650.

== Legacy ==
Two portraits of Mary Blacknall hang in Claydon House in Buckinghamshire, the country seat of the Verney family, now administered by the National Trust. She brought with her as heirlooms the Abingdon Monks' Map and the Blacknall Map from the Blacknall family. The Monks' Map has since been returned to Abingdon and is in Abingdon County Hall Museum. The Blacknall Map is still at Claydon House. A bust of Mary Blacknall can be found on a memorial in the church next to Claydon House.
