= Abingdon Monks' Map =

River Thames Map

The Abingdon Monks' Map (commonly known as The Monks' Map) is a 16th-century map of the River Thames around the town of Abingdon, Oxfordshire (formerly in Berkshire), England. It is held in the collection of the Abingdon County Hall Museum. The map covers the stretch of river between Abingdon and Radley. It is 265.5 centimetres (104.5 in) long and 41.5 centimetres (16.3 in) wide, consisting of four pieces of vellum that are glued together.

== History ==
The map was preserved in the archives of the Verney family, having been inherited by Mary Blacknall (1616–1650), who married Sir Ralph Verney, 1st Baronet, of Middle Claydon (1613–1696). In 1907, it was given to the Corporation of Abingdon and was framed and held in the Guildhall at Abingdon. The map was restored for a reopening of Abingdon Museum, where it was put on display in 2012. As part of the investigation during this process, the map was x-rayed at the National Gallery in London.

== Monks map ==
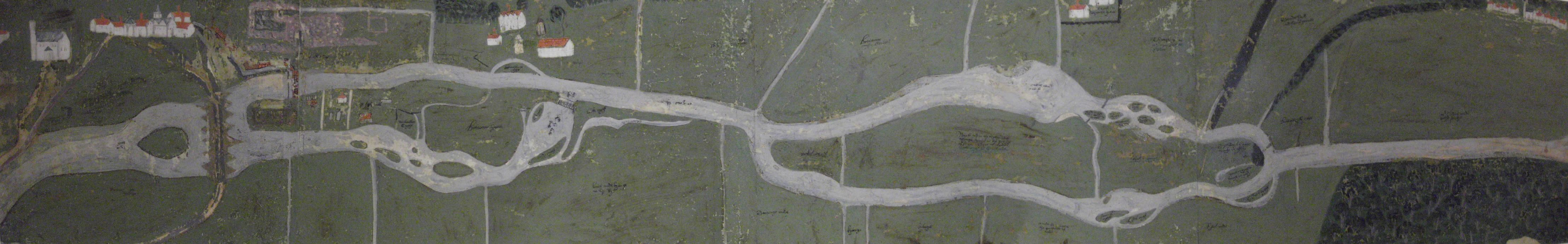
Panoramic view of the Monks' Map, on display at Abingdon County Hall Museum.

== Blacknall Map ==
Another smaller map of the river, known as the Blacknall Map (or Claydon Map), is held at Claydon House, the Verney family home, in Buckinghamshire to the north of Abingdon. This was produced for William Blacknall in support of his mill-owning and fishery rights during a lawsuit in 1570. The Monks' Map itself may well have been produced for a similar purpose rather than by monks at Abingdon Abbey.

== See also ==
- Abingdon County Hall Museum
- The Abingdon Sword
