= Richard D. Blacknall House =

Historic house in North Carolina, United States

- U.S. National Register of Historic Places
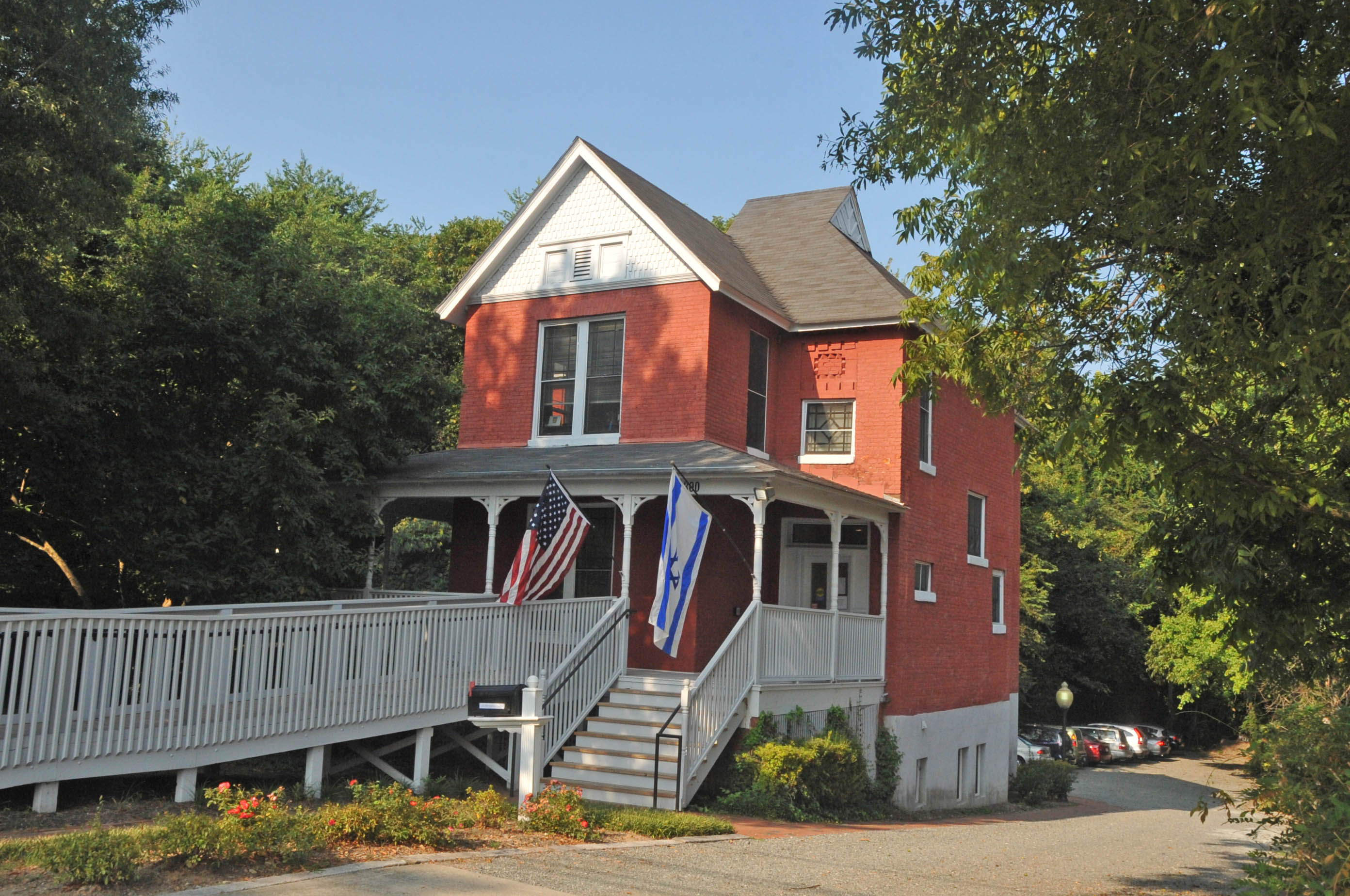
- Richard D. Blacknall House, March 2007

- Location within North Carolina Location within the United States
- Location: 300 Alexander Ave., Durham, North Carolina
- Coordinates: 36°0′13″N 78°55′38″W
- Area: less than one acre
- Built: c. 1889
- Architectural style: Queen Anne
- MPS: Durham MRA
- NRHP reference No.: 90000350
- Added to NRHP: March 1, 1990

Richard D. Blacknall House is a historic home located at Durham, Durham County, North Carolina. It was built about 1889, and is a 2 1/2-story, Queen Anne-style brick dwelling. The house features an intricate multi-planed roof and a wraparound hip roof porch. It originally stood at the southwest corner of Erwin Road and Anderson street, and was moved to its present location in 1985.

It was listed on the National Register of Historic Places in 1990.
