= Isaac Whittington =

British politician and lawyer

Member of Parliament for Amersham
- In office 15 February 1754 – 27 March 1761

Personal details
- Born: 1709
- Died: 25 April 1773 (aged 63–64)
- Party: Tory Party

Isaac Whittington (1709 – 25 April 1773) was a British politician and lawyer. A member of the Tory Party, he was Member of Parliament for Amersham from 1754 to 1761.

== Biography ==
Whittington was born in 1709, the son of Isaac Whittington, a haberdasher.

He first stood at the 1754 Amersham by-election as a candidate for the Tory Party and was elected unopposed. He stood for re-election for the Amersham constituency in the 1754 general election and he and fellow Tory candidate, William Drake were elected unopposed. Whittington did not stand at the 1761 general election.

Whittington died in April 1773.
