= William Drake (1723–1796) =

British politician

William Drake (1723–1796), was a British politician who sat in the House of Commons for 50 years between 1746 and 1796, eventually becoming Father of the House.

Drake was the son of Montague Garrard Drake, MP of Shardeloes, Buckinghamshire and his wife Isabella Marshall and was born on 12 May 1723. His father died when he was five. He was educated at Westminster School in 1738. He matriculated at Brasenose College, Oxford on 2 October 1739 aged 16 and was created DCL on 12 April 1749.

The Drake family controlled both seats at Amersham and in 1746 he was returned as Member of Parliament for Amersham. From then on he was returned at every election until his death. When the Buckinghamshire Militia was reformed in 1759 he was commissioned as its lieutenant-colonel.

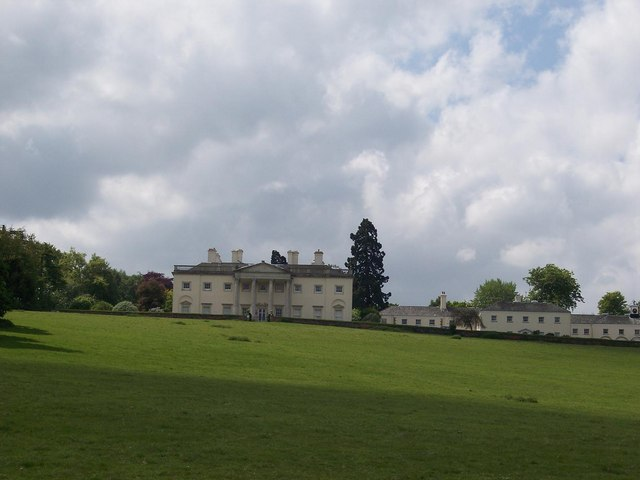
Shardeloes, Buckinghamshire

Between 1758 and 1768 he rebuilt the house at Shardeloes in the Palladian style, of stuccoed brick. The architect and builder was Stiff Leadbetter and designs for interior decorations were provided by Robert Adam.

Drake died on 8 August 1796. He had married Elizabeth Raworth, daughter of John Raworth of Basinghall St., London on 9 February 1747 and had 5 sons and 3 daughters. His eldest son William was MP for Amersham with him from 1768, but predeceased him in 1795. Shardeloes passed to his second son, Thomas Drake Tyrwhitt-Drake.

Parliament of Great Britain
Preceded by Sir Henry Marshall; Thomas Gore	Member of Parliament for Amersham; 1746–1796; With: Sir Henry Marshall 1746-1754; Isaac Whittington 1754-1761; Benet Garrard 1761-1767; John Affleck 1767-1768; William Drake, Jr 1768-1795; Thomas Drake Tyrwhitt-Drake 1795-1796	Succeeded by Thomas Drake Tyrwhitt-Drake; Charles Drake Garrard
Preceded by Welbore Ellis	Father of the House; 1790-1796	Succeeded by Sir Philip Stephens, Bt
