= Abingdon County Hall Museum =

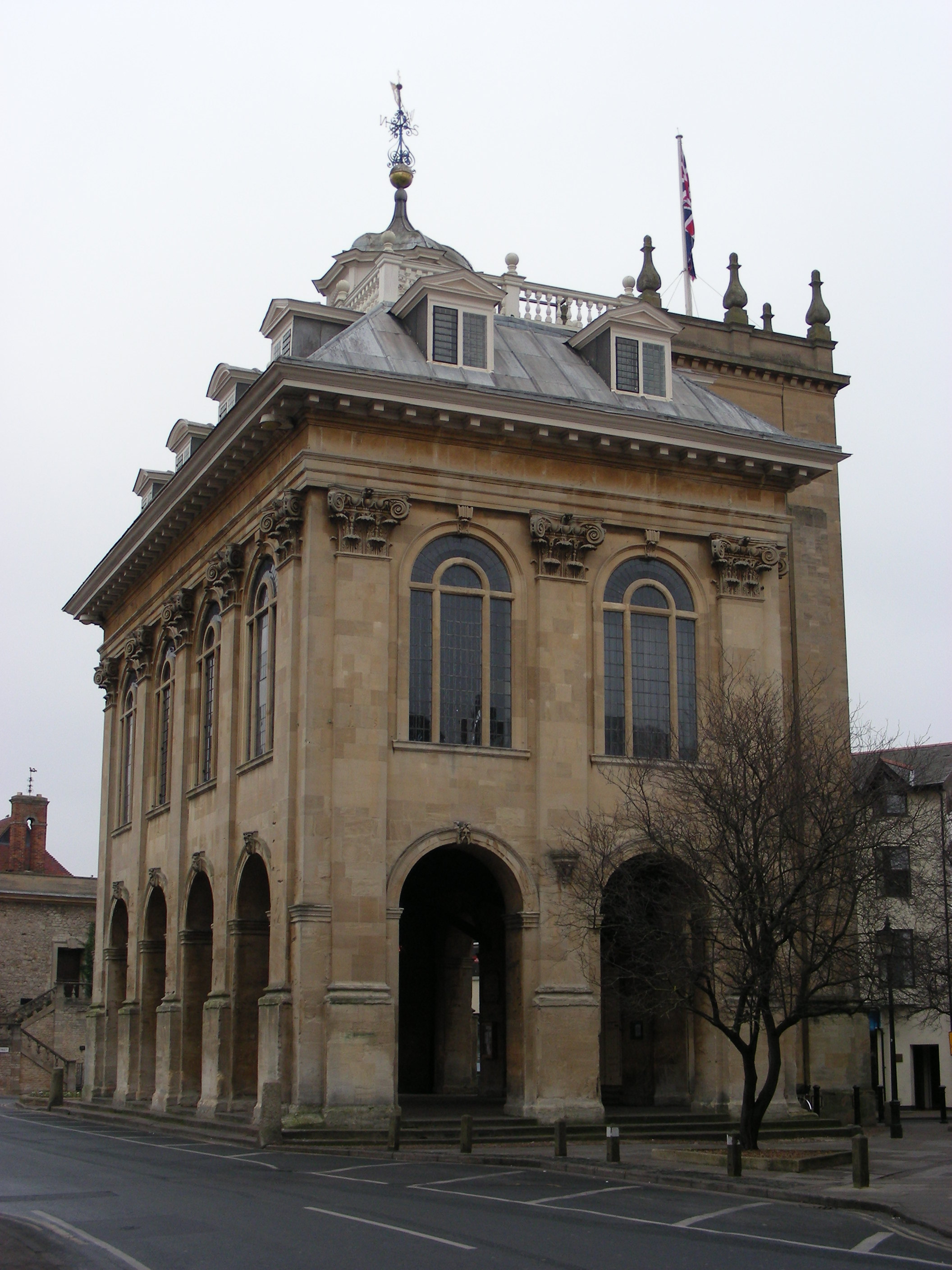
- View of the County Hall building that houses the museum.

- Location within Oxfordshire
- Established: 1678–1683 (building); 1919 (museum collection)
- Location: Abingdon, Oxfordshire, United Kingdom
- Coordinates: 51.67°N 1.2815°W
- Type: Local museum
- Collection size: Local history
- Owner: Abingdon Town Council
- Website: www.abingdon.gov.uk/partners/abingdon-county-hall-museum

Listed Building – Grade I
- Official name: County Hall and Market House
- Designated: 19 January 1951
- Reference no.: 1199601

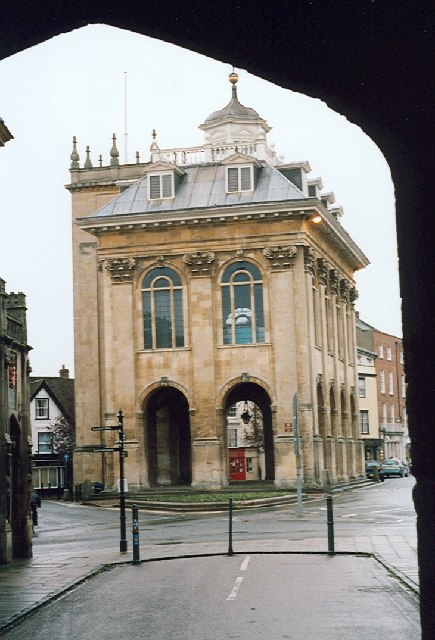
Alternative view.

Abingdon County Hall Museum (also known as Abingdon Museum) is a local museum in Abingdon, Oxfordshire, England. The museum is run by Abingdon Town Council and supported by Abingdon Museum Friends, a registered charity. It is a Grade I listed building.

== Building ==
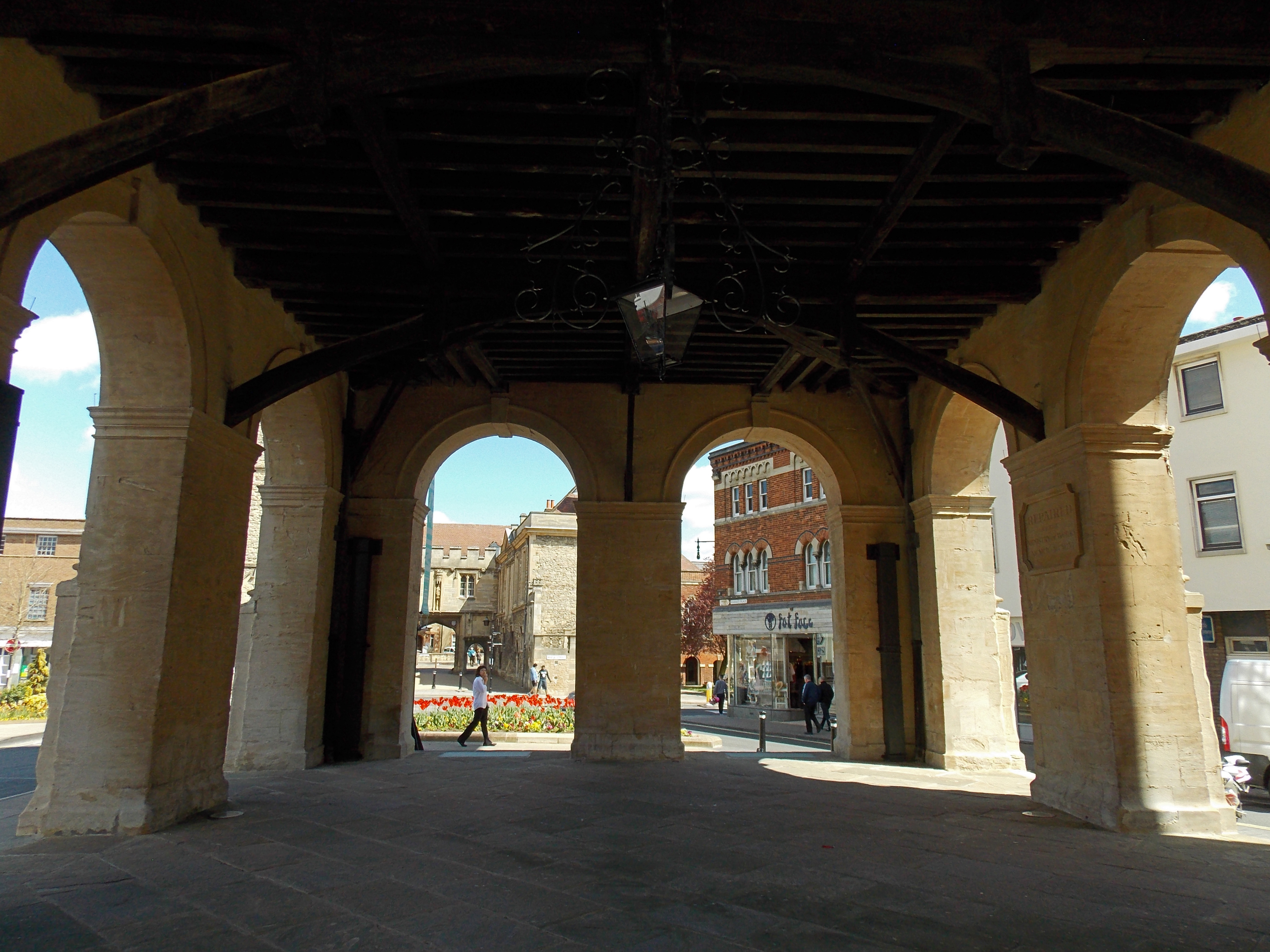
Internal view of the loggia.

The building was built as a county hall for Berkshire, Abingdon being Berkshire's county town; it was to serve as the principal sessions house and administrative home for the Justices of the county. The county hall was designed in the Baroque style by Christopher Kempster who trained with Sir Christopher Wren on St Paul's Cathedral. It stands on large pilasters with a sheltered area beneath for use as a market or other municipal functions and was completed in 1683.

Nikolaus Pevsner said of the building: "Of the free-standing town halls of England with open ground floors this is the grandest". It housed a courtroom for the assizes until 1867 when Abingdon ceded that role to Reading Assize Courts.

Following the completion of a major restoration of the building, Queen Elizabeth II, visited the town hall, signed the visitor's book and unveiled a plaque in November 1956.

== Collections and exhibitions ==
The museum's collections were started in 1919. The museum has permanent collections and presents temporary exhibitions several times a year. There are also smaller exhibitions on local themes that are changed every month. The Monks' Map of the River Thames around Abingdon in the 16th century has been held at the town's Guildhall since 1907. A reproduction of the Anglo-Saxon Abingdon Sword, discovered in the river at Abingdon and held by the Ashmolean Museum in Oxford, has also been put on display. In December 2011, with the help of British Motor Heritage, the last MGB Roadster sports car, which came off the production line in Abingdon in 1980 was lifted through a window 30 feet up, for display in the museum's main gallery.

From 2010 to 2012, the museum and building underwent a two-year restoration programme, partly funded by the National Lottery. The museum was informally reopened to visitors by Martha Howe-Douglas, an actress in the BBC television series Horrible Histories, in July 2012 and was officially reopened by the Duke of Gloucester on 8 March 2013. A new museum café was established in the basement.
