= Sir John Garrard, 3rd Baronet =

English politician

Baronet (of Lamer)
- In office 1638–1701
- Preceded by: John Garrard
- Succeeded by: Samuel Garrard

Personal details
- Born: 1638 Wheathampstead, England
- Died: 1701 (aged 62–63)
- Spouse: Katherine (m. 1669)
- Children: 1

Sir John Garrard, 3rd Baronet (1638–1701), was an English politician.

== Biography ==
Garrard was the eldest son of Sir John Garrard, 2nd Baronet, of the Garrard baronets and Jane Lambard, daughter of Sir Moulton Lambard, and educated at Christ Church, Oxford (1657) and the Inner Temple (1658). He succeeded his father in the baronetcy and to Lamer Park, Wheathampstead in Hertfordshire in 1686.

He was elected a Member of Parliament for Ludgershall in October 1679 and for Amersham in 1698 and for 7 January to 13 January 1701.

He was High Sheriff of Hertfordshire for 1690–91.

He died in 1701 and was laid to rest at St Helen's Church, Wheathampstead. He had married in 1669 to Katherine, the daughter and coheiress of Sir James Enyon, 1st Baronet, of Floore, Northamptonshire and the widow of Sir George Buswell, 1st Bt., of Clipston, Northants. They had one daughter Jane, who married Montagu Drake of Shardeloes, but no son, and he was thus succeeded by his younger brother Sir Samuel Garrard, 4th Baronet.

Baronetage of England
| Preceded by John Garrard | Baronet (of Lamer); 1686–1701 | Succeeded by Samuel Garrard |
