= Garrard baronets =

Extinct baronetcy in the Baronetage of England

There have been two baronetcies created for persons with the surname Garrard, both in the Baronetage of England. Both creations are extinct.

The Garrard Baronetcy, of Lamer in the County of Hertford, was created in the Baronetage of England on 16 February 1622 for Sir John Garrard. He was the son of Sir John Garrard, Lord Mayor of London in 1601, and grandson of Sir William Garrard, Lord Mayor of London in 1555. The third Baronet represented Ludgershall and Amersham in Parliament. The fourth and sixth Baronets also sat as Members of Parliament for Amersham. The title became extinct on the death of the sixth Baronet in 1767.

The Garrard Baronetcy, of Langford in the County of Norfolk, was created in the Baronetage of England on 16 August 1662 for Sir Jacob Garrard, a wealthy London merchant. He was the son of Thomas Garrard, Sheriff of the City of London. The title became extinct on the death of the third Baronet in 1728.

== Garrard baronets, of Lamer (1622) ==
Escutcheon of the Garrard baronets of Lamer

- Sir John Garrard, 1st Baronet (c. 1590–1637)
- Sir John Garrard, 2nd Baronet (died 1686)
- Sir John Garrard, 3rd Baronet (1638–1701)
- Sir Samuel Garrard, 4th Baronet (1651–1725)
- Sir Samuel Garrard, 5th Baronet (1692–1761)
- Sir Benet Garrard, 6th Baronet (c. 1704–1767)

== Garrard baronets, of Langford (1662) ==
Escutcheon of the Garrard baronets of Langford

- Sir Jacob Garrard, 1st Baronet (1586–c. 1666)
- Sir Thomas Garrard, 2nd Baronet (1627–c. 1690)
  - Jacob Garrard, dvp, father of Sarah, who married Charles Downing (third son of Sir George Downing, 1st Baronet) and was the mother of:
    - Sir Jacob Garrard Downing, 4th Baronet
- Sir Nicholas Garrard, 3rd Baronet (c. 1655–1728)
