= Sir Ralph Verney, 1st Baronet, of Middle Claydon =

English baronet and politician

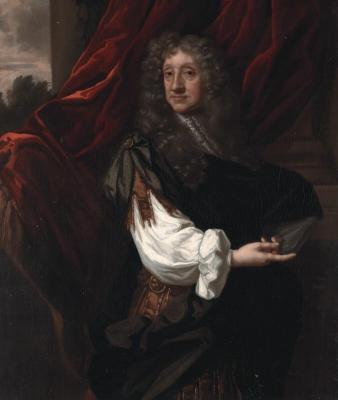
Portrait, oil, of Sir Ralph Verney, 1st Bt by Sir Peter Lely (1618–1680).

Sir Ralph Verney, 1st Baronet DL, JP (12 November 1613 – 24 September 1696) was an English baronet and politician who sat in the House of Commons at various times between 1640 and 1690.

== Background ==
Baptised at Hillesden in Buckinghamshire, he was the eldest son of Sir Edmund Verney and his wife Margaret, eldest daughter of Sir Thomas Denton. He was the great grandson of Hon. Elizabeth Verney, second daughter of the first Baron Braye. Verney was educated at Magdalen Hall, Oxford and was called to the bar by the Middle Temple.

== Career ==
Verney entered the Short Parliament in 1640, sitting as Member of Parliament for Aylesbury. He was re-elected MP for Aylesbury for the Long Parliament in November 1640. He was present in the trial of Thomas Wentworth, 1st Earl of Strafford in January 1641, making notes, and was knighted in March. Verney opposed William Laud before the Civil War, and sided with the Parliamentarians at its outset; however, when he did not partake in the Solemn League and Covenant in 1643, he was forced to flee into exile; three years thereafter his assets were confiscated. He went first to the Netherlands, met his wife in Blois in France, where she died, and arrived then in Italy. He was disabled from sitting in Parliament on 22 September 1645.

Following his return to England in 1653, Verney was captured and imprisoned two years later, however released with a fine in 1656.

After the English Restoration in 1660, on advice of Anne Wilmot, Countess of Rochester, Verney stood for Great Bedwyn, but was unsuccessful. He was appointed a Commissioner of Oyer and Terminer for the Norfolk circuit in July and a Commissioner of Assessment in August, serving in Buckinghamshire. For the latter county Verney was a Justice of the Peace as well as a Deputy Lieutenant. On 16 March 1661, King Charles II of England made him a Baronet, of Middle Claydon, in the County of Buckingham. A year later, he became a Commissioner of Sewers in Bedfordshire and was additionally a commissioner for loyal and indigent officers in the same county.

In 1675, Verney was nominated a Commissioner of Recusants in Buckinghamshire. He was re-elected to the House in 1681 and represented Buckingham until 1690. During this time as Member of Parliament, he spoke against the coronation of William of Orange as king of England.

== Family ==
On 31 May 1629, Verney married Mary Blacknall, daughter of John Blacknall in Hillesdon and had by her three sons and as many daughters. He died, aged 82 and was buried at Middle Claydon on 9 October 1696. His eldest son Edmund predeceased him and Verney was succeeded in the baronetcy by his second son John, who was later raised to the Peerage of Ireland as Viscount Fermanagh.

Parliament of England
Vacant Parliament suspended since 1629	Member of Parliament for Aylesbury; 1640–1645; With: Sir John Pakington, 2nd Baronet 1640; Thomas Fountaine 1640; Sir John Pakington, 2nd Baronet 1641–1642	Succeeded by Thomas Scot; Simon Mayne
Preceded by Sir Richard Temple; Viscount Latimer	Member of Parliament for Buckingham; 1681–1690; With: Sir Richard Temple	Succeeded by Alexander Denton; Sir Richard Temple
Baronetage of England
New creation	Baronet (of Middle Claydon); 1661–1696	Succeeded by John Verney
