= Amersham (constituency) =

Parliamentary constituency in the United Kingdom, 1624 to 1832

- Former borough constituency for the House of Commons
- Borough: Amersham

1624–1832
- Seats: 2
- Replaced by: Buckinghamshire

Amersham, often spelt as Agmondesham, was a constituency of the House of Commons of England until 1707, then in the House of Commons of Great Britain from 1707 to 1800 and finally in the House of Commons of the United Kingdom from 1801 to 1832. It was represented by two Members of Parliament (MPs), elected by the bloc-vote system.

== Boundaries ==
The constituency was a parliamentary borough in Buckinghamshire, covering part of the small town of Amersham. It is located 2 miles north west of London, in the Chiltern Hills of England. Davis describes it as "a thriving little market town".

Before the borough was re-enfranchised in 1624 and after it was disenfranchised in 1832, the area was represented as part of the county constituency of Buckinghamshire.

== History ==
The borough was first enfranchised in 1300, but only seems to have sent burgesses to Parliament for a short time. By 1307 it was no longer included in the list of Parliamentary boroughs. In the 17th century a solicitor named William Hakewill, of Lincoln's Inn, rediscovered ancient writs confirming that Amersham, Great Marlow, and Wendover had all sent members to Parliament in the past, and succeeded in re-establishing their privileges (despite the opposition of James I), so that they resumed electing members from the Parliament of 1624. Hakewill himself was elected for Amersham in 1624.

The right of election was held by householders paying scot and lot, a local tax. This was one of the most democratic franchises used in elections to the Unreformed House of Commons. However, because this was a small borough, from the seventeenth to the nineteenth centuries, it was under the patronage of the Drake family of Shardeloes (an estate about a mile from the town).

In the early eighteenth century, there were about 150 electors. Although, at this period, the Drakes did not own most of the houses, they were able to nominate candidates for both seats. An anti-Drake element in the electorate supported a candidate in opposition to the Tory candidates promoted by the Drake interest, at elections in 1728, 1734 and 1735. That opposition proved to represent about a third of the electorate.

Thereafter the Drakes enjoyed unchallenged possession of their pocket borough. There was no further sign of the sort of resistance to the dominant interest that broke out from time to time in many similar boroughs.

By the latter half of the eighteenth century, the Drakes owned most of the town. The number of voters were reduced to about 70. Elections were all uncontested.

The borough was treated with respect by its patrons. Uncontested elections were accompanied by generous expenditure, estimated by Davis as £350 in the eighteenth century and £600 in the 1820s.

Amersham was one of the boroughs totally disenfranchised by the Reform Act 1832. The 1831 census had shown that the population of the borough was 1,347, and there were 247 houses (although the whole town of Amersham had 360 houses).

== Members of Parliament ==
Year	First member	Second member
Constituency re-enfranchised by Parliament in 1624
1624	John Crew	William Hakewill
1625	John Crew	Francis Drake
1626	William Clarke	Francis Drake
1628	William Hakewill	Edmund Waller
1629–1640	No Parliaments summoned	
1640	William Drake	Edmund Waller
1640	Francis Drake	William Cheyney (d. April 1641)
1641	Francis Drake	William Drake
1648	Both members excluded in Pride's Purge	

- Not represented in the First and Second Protectorate Parliaments; returned two members for the Third Protectorate Parliament.

Year	First member	First party	Second member	Second party
1659	Francis Drake		John Biscoe	
1660	Charles Cheyne		Thomas Proby	
1661	Sir William Drake, Bt		Thomas Proby	
1669	Sir William Drake		Thomas Proby	
1679	Sir William Drake		Sir Roger Hill	
1681	Sir William Drake		Hon. William Cheyne	
1689	Sir William Drake		Edmund Waller	
1690	William Montagu		Edmund Waller	
1695	Montagu Drake		Edmund Waller	
1698	The 2nd Viscount Newhaven		Sir John Garrard, Bt	
1699	John Drake		Sir John Garrard, Bt	
1701	The 2nd Viscount Newhaven		Sir John Garrard, Bt	
1701	The 2nd Viscount Newhaven		John Drake	
1701	Sir Samuel Garrard, Bt		John Drake	
1701	The 2nd Viscount Newhaven		John Drake	
1702	Sir Samuel Garrard, Bt		John Drake	
1705	Sir Samuel Garrard, Bt		The 2nd Viscount Newhaven	
1707	Sir Samuel Garrard, Bt		John Drake	
1708	Sir Samuel Garrard, Bt		Francis Duncombe	
1710	John Drake		Francis Duncombe	
1713	Montague Garrard Drake	Tory	The 1st Viscount Fermanagh	Tory
1717	Montague Garrard Drake	Tory	The 2nd Viscount Fermanagh	Tory
1722	Thomas Chapman	Tory	The 2nd Viscount Fermanagh	Tory
1727	Montague Garrard Drake	Tory	Baptist Leveson-Gower	Tory
1728	Montague Garrard Drake	Tory	Thomas Lutwyche	Tory
1728	Marmaduke Alington	Tory	Thomas Lutwyche	Tory
1734	Sir Henry Marshall	Tory	Thomas Lutwyche	Tory
1735	Sir Henry Marshall	Tory	Thomas Gore	Tory
1746	Sir Henry Marshall	Tory	William Drake, Sr	No Party
1754	Isaac Whittington	Tory	William Drake, Sr	No Party
1761	Benet Garrard		William Drake, Sr	No Party
1767	John Affleck	Tory	William Drake, Sr	No Party
1768	William Drake, Jr	Tory	William Drake, Sr	No Party
1795	Thomas Drake Tyrwhitt-Drake	Tory	William Drake, Sr	No Party
1796	Thomas Drake Tyrwhitt-Drake	Tory	Charles Drake Garrard	Tory
1805	Thomas Drake Tyrwhitt-Drake	Tory	Thomas Tyrwhitt-Drake	Tory
1810	William Tyrwhitt-Drake	Tory	Thomas Tyrwhitt-Drake	Tory

- Constituency disenfranchised (1832)

== Elections ==
=== General notes ===
In multi-member elections the bloc voting system was used. Voters could cast a vote for one or two candidates, as they chose. The leading candidates with the largest number of votes were elected.

In by-elections, to fill a single seat, the first past the post system applied.

Where a party had more than one candidate in one or both of a pair of successive elections change is calculated for each individual candidate, otherwise change is based on the party vote. Change figures at by-elections are from the preceding general election or the last intervening by-election. Change figures at general elections are from the last general election.

Candidates for whom no party has been identified are classified as Non Partisan. The candidate might have been associated with a party or faction in Parliament or considered himself to belong to a particular political tradition. Political parties before the nineteenth century were not as cohesive or organised as they later became. Contemporary commentators (even the reputed leaders of parties or factions) in the eighteenth century did not necessarily agree who the party supporters were. The traditional parties, which had arisen in the late seventeenth century, became increasingly irrelevant to politics in the eighteenth century (particularly after 1760), although for some contests in some constituencies party labels were still used. It was only towards the end of the century that party labels began to acquire some meaning again, although this process was by no means complete for several more generations.

Sources: The results for elections before 1790 were taken from the History of Parliament Trust publications on the House of Commons. The results from 1790 until 1832 are based on Stooks Smith. Where Stooks Smith gives additional information to the other sources this is indicated in a note.

=== Dates of elections 1660–1715 ===
- April 1660 General election
- 23 March 1661 General election
- 1 November 1669 By-election
- 4 February 1679 General election
- (unknown date) 1679 General election
- 29 January 1681 General election
- 23 March 1685 General election
- 5 January 1689 General election
- (unknown date) 1690 General election
- 8 October 1690 By-election
- 9 November 1691 By-election
- 21 October 1695 General election
- 21 July 1698 General election
- 2 January 1699 By-election
- 7 January 1701 General election
- 19 February 1701 By-election
- 10 March 1701 By-election
- 21 November 1701 General election
- 14 November 1702 General election
- 8 May 1705 General election
- 21 November 1707 By-election
- 4 May 1708 General election
- 3 October 1710 General election
- 27 August 1713 General election
- 18 March 1714 By-election

=== Election results 1715–1832 ===
As with most boroughs in the unreformed House of Commons, Amersham was uncontested at most elections. The only known contested elections after 1715 were those of 1728, 1735 and 1736.

General election 26 January 1715: Amersham (2 seats)
Party	Candidate	Votes	%	±%
Tory	Montague Garrard Drake	Unopposed	N/A	N/A
Tory	The 1st Viscount Fermanagh	Unopposed	N/A	N/A

- Death of Fermanagh 23 June 1717

By-election 10 July 1717: Amersham
Party	Candidate	Votes	%	±%
Tory	The 2nd Viscount Fermanagh	Unopposed	N/A	N/A
Tory hold		Swing	N/A	

General election 21 March 1722: Amersham (2 seats)
Party	Candidate	Votes	%	±%
Tory	Montague Garrard Drake	Unopposed	N/A	N/A
Tory	The 2nd Viscount Fermanagh	Unopposed	N/A	N/A

- Choice of Drake to sit for Buckinghamshire

By-election 27 October 1722: Amersham
Party	Candidate	Votes	%	±%
Tory	Thomas Chapman	Unopposed	N/A	N/A
Tory hold		Swing	N/A	

General election 17 August 1727: Amersham (2 seats)
Party	Candidate	Votes	%	±%
Tory	Montague Garrard Drake	Unopposed	N/A	N/A
Tory	Baptist Leveson-Gower	Unopposed	N/A	N/A

- Choice of Leveson Gower to sit for Newcastle-under-Lyme

By-election 23 February 1728: Amersham
Party	Candidate	Votes	%	±%
Tory	Thomas Lutwyche	Unopposed	N/A	N/A
Tory hold		Swing	N/A	

- Death of Drake 26 April 1728

By-election 16 May 1728: Amersham
Party	Candidate	Votes	%	±%
Tory	Marmaduke Alington	64	65.31	N/A
Non Partisan	Charles Hayes	34	34.69	N/A
Majority		30	30.61	N/A
Tory hold		Swing	N/A	

- (Note May 1728): Drake, the late MP, had been the owner of the largest interest in the constituency. His heir was a child and the anti-Drake element in the borough took advantage of the opportunity to contest the seat. Only about a third of the votes were cast for the challenger.

General election 25 April 1734: Amersham (2 seats)
Party	Candidate	Votes	%	±%
Tory	Henry Marshall	106	44.73	+44.73
Tory	Thomas Lutwyche	81	34.18	+34.18
Non Partisan	Thomas Bladen	50	21.10	−9.51

- (Note 1734): Thomas Bladen stood for the anti-Drake forces in the borough. The result again suggested that only about a third of the electorate opposed the borough's long term patrons.
- Death of Lutwyche 13 November 1734

By-election 17 February 1735: Amersham
Party	Candidate	Votes	%	±%
Tory	Thomas Gore	Elected	N/A	N/A
Non Partisan	Thomas Bladen	Defeated	N/A	N/A
Tory hold		Swing	N/A	

- (Note 1735): The vote totals are unknown, but Gore won and no further contested elections took place during the remaining 97 years when the borough returned MPs.

General election 4 May 1741: Amersham (2 seats)
Party	Candidate	Votes	%	±%
Tory	Sir Henry Marshall	Unopposed	N/A	N/A
Tory	Thomas Gore	Unopposed	N/A	N/A

- Appointment of Gore as Commissary General of the Musters (he was returned for Portsmouth)

By-election 26 February 1746: Amersham
Party	Candidate	Votes	%	±%
Non Partisan	William Drake, Sr	Unopposed	N/A	N/A
Tory hold		Swing	N/A	

General election 27 June 1747: Amersham (2 seats)
Party	Candidate	Votes	%	±%
Non Partisan	William Drake, Sr	Unopposed	N/A	N/A
Tory	Sir Henry Marshall	Unopposed	N/A	N/A

- Death of Marshall 2 February 1754

By-election 15 February 1754: Amersham
Party	Candidate	Votes	%	±%
Tory	Isaac Whittington	Unopposed	N/A	N/A
Tory hold		Swing	N/A	

General election 16 April 1754: Amersham (2 seats)
Party	Candidate	Votes	%	±%
Non Partisan	William Drake, Sr	Unopposed	N/A	N/A
Tory	Isaac Whittington	Unopposed	N/A	N/A

General election 27 March 1761: Amersham (2 seats)
Party	Candidate	Votes	%	±%
Non Partisan	William Drake, Sr	Unopposed	N/A	N/A
Non Partisan	Benet Garrard	Unopposed	N/A	N/A

- Death of Garrard

By-election 4 December 1767: Amersham
Party	Candidate	Votes	%	±%
Non Partisan	John Affleck	Unopposed	N/A	N/A
Non Partisan hold		Swing	N/A	

General election 28 March 1768: Amersham (2 seats)
Party	Candidate	Votes	%	±%
Non Partisan	William Drake, Sr	Unopposed	N/A	N/A
Tory	William Drake, Jr	Unopposed	N/A	N/A

General election 7 October 1774: Amersham (2 seats)
Party	Candidate	Votes	%	±%
Non Partisan	William Drake, Sr	Unopposed	N/A	N/A
Tory	William Drake, Jr	Unopposed	N/A	N/A

General election 8 September 1780: Amersham (2 seats)
Party	Candidate	Votes	%	±%
Non Partisan	William Drake, Sr	Unopposed	N/A	N/A
Tory	William Drake, Jr	Unopposed	N/A	N/A

General election 31 March 1784: Amersham (2 seats)
Party	Candidate	Votes	%	±%
Non Partisan	William Drake, Sr	Unopposed	N/A	N/A
Tory	William Drake, Jr	Unopposed	N/A	N/A

- -- --- 1790 GE
- -4 Jun 1795 BE
- 26 May 1796 GE
- -- --- 1802 GE
- 31 Jan 1805 BE
- -- --- 1806 GE
- -- --- 1807 GE
- 21 Nov 1810 BE
- -- --- 1812 GE
- -- --- 1818 GE
- -- --- 1820 GE
- -- --- 1826 GE

General election, 30 July 1830: Amersham
Party	Candidate	Votes	%
Tory	William Tyrwhitt-Drake	Unopposed	
Tory	Thomas Tyrwhitt-Drake	Unopposed	
Registered electors		c. 130	
Tory hold			
Tory hold			

General election, 29 April 1831: Amersham
Party	Candidate	Votes	%
Tory	William Tyrwhitt-Drake	Unopposed	
Tory	Thomas Tyrwhitt-Drake	Unopposed	
Registered electors		c. 130	
Tory hold			
Tory hold			

== See also ==
- List of former United Kingdom Parliament constituencies
- Chesham and Amersham (UK Parliament constituency) constituency created in 1974
