= William Selby Lowndes =

William Selby Lowndes (c. 1767 – 18 May 1840) was a United Kingdom Member of Parliament.

The Lowndes family were conservative Anglican landowners in the English county of Buckinghamshire. This gentry family was prominent in the county during the eighteenth and nineteenth centuries. Richard Lowndes had represented Buckinghamshire in Parliament between 1741 and 1774.

== Public career ==
William Selby Lowndes served as a knight of the shire representing Buckinghamshire in the United Kingdom House of Commons from 1810 to 1820.

He was known as a High Church Anglican and became a supporter of Viscount Sidmouth's policy of limiting the number of dissenting ministers given official toleration. He came into conflict with the Nonconformist minority of the local population in the first decade of the nineteenth century.

Selby Lowndes, who was Chairman of the county Quarter Sessions (at this period a body of magistrates with both judicial and administrative responsibilities), had refused registration as a dissenting minister to the Reverend Peter Tyler who had a congregation at Haddenham, Buckinghamshire.

Tyler was to become a major figure in the political campaigns of the Bucks dissenters and a leading local Liberal. His case was one of those raised by opponents to Sidmouth's bill on the issue.

The conservative religious views of Selby Lowndes, which balanced the comparative liberalism of the Grenville family who normally filled one of the two county seats in Parliament, made him an attractive candidate to hold the other seat. However, in the 1820 election, when he unexpectedly did not seek re-election, his seat was gained unopposed by the Hon. Robert Smith an advocate of the Whig policy of religious liberty.

== Davies v Lowndes (1838) litigation ==
Selby Lowndes was a party to the last action for recovery of land brought by writ of right before the Court of Common Pleas, heard before the Grand Assize of Buckinghamshire (a jury like body of four knights of the shire and twelve recogniters). At one time such actions had been dealt with by trial by battle, but such trials had been abolished in 1819. The whole form of action by writ of right procedure had been abolished by Parliament for the future, by the time this case was heard.

Selby Lowndes had won the first trial of the case, but on appeal the case was sent back for a re-trial. Lord Chief Justice Tindal and the other judges of the court presided at the trial at bar in Westminster Hall which started on 28 November 1838. Selby Lowndes was represented, as lead Counsel, by the Attorney General Sir John Campbell.

The case concerned an estate known as Whaddon Hall in Buckinghamshire worth between £4,000 and £5,000 a year. A Mr T. J. Selby had left the estate to his heir at law and if none could be found to a friend of his, who was then a Major of the Militia named William Lowndes, on condition he changed his surname to Selby Lowndes. Selby died in 1772. Many people claimed to be the heir-at-law but eventually the claims were all dismissed. By 1783 Lowndes, the father of the subject of this article, had changed his name and inherited the estate. Selby Lowndes father had settled the estate upon him, on his marriage.

The day before the applicable sixty year limitation period for a claim of this nature expired on 6 December 1832, a Mr Davies claimed the estate on the basis that he was the heir at law of the late Mr Selby.

The grand assize found for Selby Lowndes.

Parliament of the United Kingdom
Preceded by Marquess of Titchfield; Earl Temple	Member for Buckinghamshire; 1810–1820; With: Earl Temple 1810–1813; Thomas Grenville 1813–1818; Marquess of Chandos 1818–1820	Succeeded by Marquess of Chandos; Hon. Robert Smith
