= Sir Thomas Lee, 3rd Baronet =

English politician

Sir Thomas Lee, 3rd Baronet (1687–1749), of Hartwell, near Aylesbury, Buckinghamshire, was an English politician who sat in the House of Commons almost continuously from 1710 to 1741.

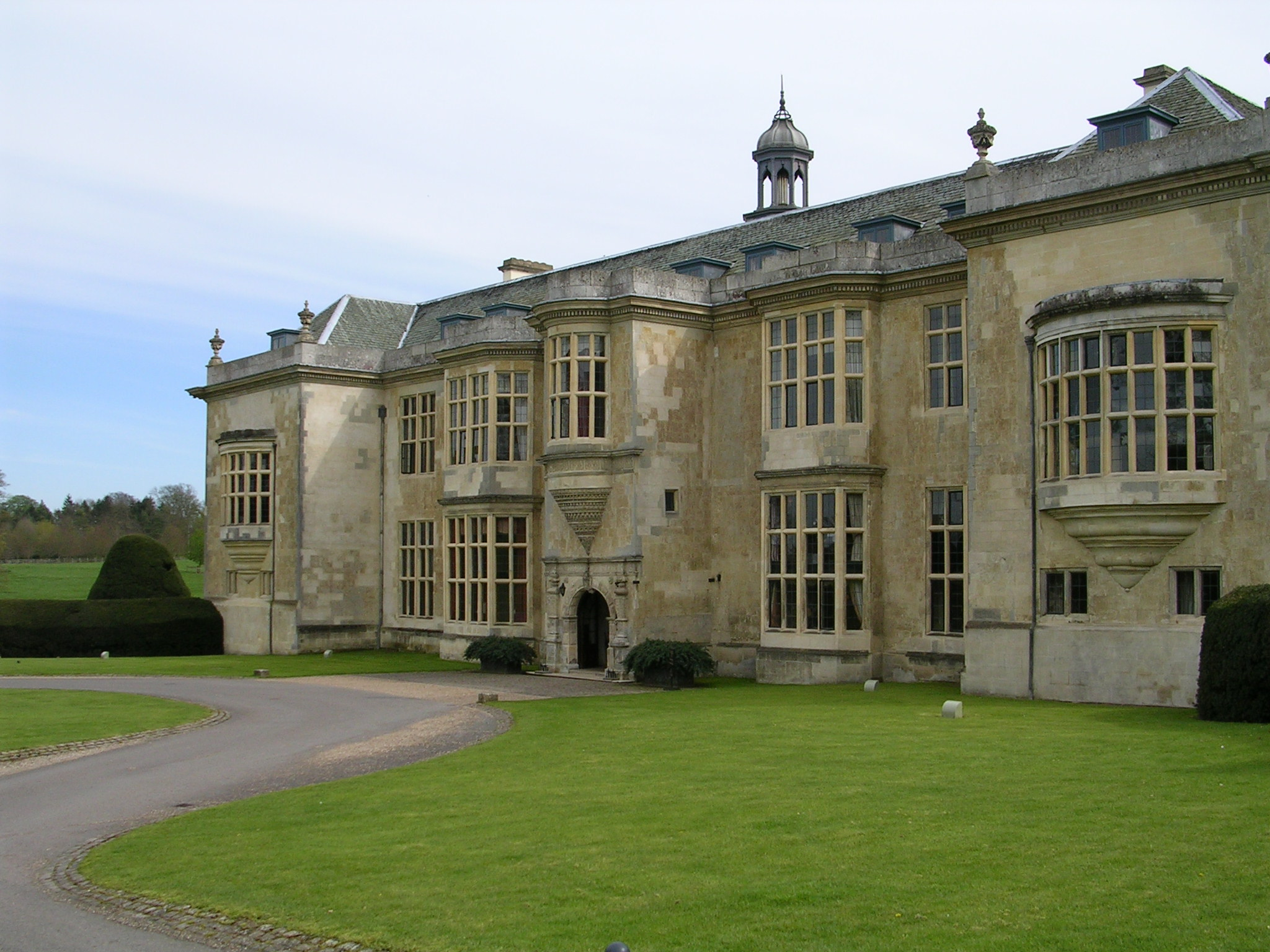
Hartwell House

Lee was the eldest son of Sir Thomas Lee, 2nd Baronet, MP and the brother of George, John and William. He succeeded his father in 1702, inheriting the family seat at Hartwell, near Aylesbury, Buckinghamshire.

Lee was returned unopposed as Member of Parliament for Chipping Wycombe at the 1710 general election. He was returned unopposed again for Wycombe in 1713 and 1715. In the latter year he was appointed Colonel of the Buckinghamshire Militia. At the 1722 general election he was elected instead as MP for Buckinghamshire. He did not stand at the 1727 general election but was returned as MP for Buckinghamshire at a by-election on 29 January 1729. He was elected again at the 1734 general election, but did not stand in 1741.

Lee married in 1720, Elizabeth Sandys, the daughter and heiress of Thomas Sandys of London and had two sons and a daughter. He was succeeded by his second son William.

Parliament of Great Britain
Preceded by Fleetwood Dormer; Charles Godfrey	for Chipping Wycombe; 1710–1722; With: Charles Godfrey to 1713; Sir John Wittewronge, Bt 1713 – February 1722; John Neale February–March 1722	Succeeded by Charles Egerton; The Earl of Shelburne
Preceded by Richard Hampden; John Fleetwood	Member of Parliament for Buckinghamshire; 1722–1727; With: Montague Garrard Drake	Succeeded by Richard Hampden; Sir William Stanhope
Preceded by Richard Hampden; Sir William Stanhope	Member of Parliament for Buckinghamshire; 1729–1741; With: Sir William Stanhope	Succeeded by Richard Grenville-Temple; Richard Lowndes
Baronetage of England
Preceded by Thomas Lee	Baronet (of Hartwell); 1702–1749	Succeeded by William Lee
