= Elizabeth Egerton, Countess of Bridgewater =

Elizabeth Egerton, Countess of Bridgewater, may refer to:

- Elizabeth Cavendish, Countess of Bridgewater, 1626 to 1663
- Elizabeth Churchill, Countess of Bridgewater, 1687 to 1716

== See also ==
- Countess of Bridgewater
