= Richard Hampden (died 1728) =

English Whig politician

Arms of Hampden: Argent, a saltire gules between four eagles displayed azure

Richard Hampden PC (aft. 1674 – 27 July 1728) of Great Hampden, near Wendover, Buckinghamshire was an English Whig politician who sat in the House of Commons almost continuously from 1701 to 1728.

== Early life ==
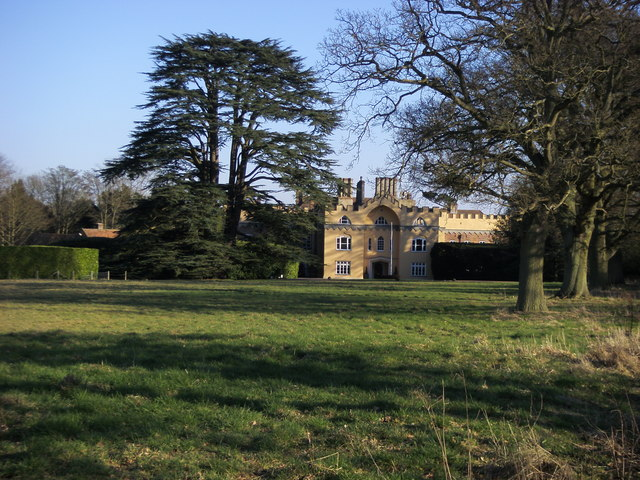
Hampden House

Hampden was the eldest son of John Hampden, and his first wife Sarah Foley, daughter of Thomas Foley of Witley Court, Worcestershire. He was great-grandson of Ship money tax protester John Hampden. His younger half-brother was John Hampden, MP. In 1696, he succeeded his father to the Wendover estate and Hampden House. His father committed suicide, which was agreed to be a "sad cloud" over the son: friends urged him not to react by "sowing his wild oats". He studied at Utrecht in 1699. In 1701, he married his first cousin Isabella Ellys, daughter of Sir William Ellys, 2nd Baronet, MP of Wyham and Nocton, Lincolnshire.

== Career ==
Hampden was returned unopposed as MP for Wendover at the two general elections of 1701, and was elected in contest in 1703 and 1705. At the 1708 general election, he was returned unopposed as MP for Buckinghamshire but was defeated in contests in 1710 and 1713. In 1710 he was offered a seat on the Treasury Commission but refused. He then quarreled with the Queen, urging her not to dissolve Parliament. Anne made the crushing retort that "though she had offered him employment she had not asked for his advice". He was returned as MP for Berwick-on-Tweed at a by-election on 22 December 1711 and at the 1713 general election.

Hampden was returned unopposed as MP for Buckinghamshire again at the 1715 general election. In 1716 he was appointed Teller of the Exchequer. In 1718, he was sworn of the Privy Council and appointed Treasurer of the Navy. In 1719 he was one of the original backers of the Royal Academy of Music, establishing a London opera company which commissioned numerous works from Handel and others. In 1720, he speculated in the stock of the South Sea Company using naval funds to make a personal profit. When the South Sea Bubble burst, he made losses of £90,000, of which less than half was secured. He was consequentially dismissed from office. In 1722 he was elected MP at Wendover and in 1727, he was returned unopposed at Wendover and elected without his knowledge at Buckinghamshire and chose to sit for the latter.

Hampden died on 27 July 1728.

Parliament of England
| Preceded by Richard Beke; John Backwell | Member of Parliament for Wendover; 1701–1707; With: John Backwell 1701; Richard Crawley 1701–1702, 1702–1705; Sir Roger Hill 1702, 1705–1707 | Succeeded by Parliament of Great Britain |
Parliament of Great Britain
| Preceded by Parliament of England | Member of Parliament for Wendover; 1707–1708; With: Sir Roger Hill 1707–1708 | Succeeded by Sir Roger Hill; Thomas Ellys |
| Preceded by Sir Richard Temple, Bt; William Egerton | Member of Parliament for Buckinghamshire; 1708–1710; With: Sir Edmund Denton, Bt | Succeeded by Sir Edmund Denton, Bt; The Viscount Fermanagh |
| Preceded by William Kerr; Jonathan Hutchinson | Member of Parliament for Berwick upon Tweed; 1711–1715; With: William Kerr 1711–1713; William Orde 1713–1715 | Succeeded by Grey Neville; John Shute Barrington |
| Preceded by Sir Roger Hill; Henry Grey | Member of Parliament for Wendover; 1713–1714; With: Sir Roger Hill | Succeeded by Sir Roger Hill; James Stanhope |
| Preceded by The Viscount Fermanagh; John Fleetwood | Member of Parliament for Buckinghamshire; 1715–1722; With: John Fleetwood | Succeeded by Montagu Garrard Drake; Sir Thomas Lee, Bt |
| Preceded by Sir Roger Hill; Richard Grenville | Member of Parliament for Wendover; 1722–1728; With: Sir Richard Steele 1720–1727; The Viscount Limerick 1727–1728 | Succeeded by The Viscount Limerick; John Hamilton |
| Preceded by Montagu Garrard Drake; Sir Thomas Lee, Bt | Member of Parliament for Buckinghamshire; 1727–1728; With: Sir William Stanhope | Succeeded by Sir William Stanhope; Sir Thomas Lee, Bt |
Political offices
| Preceded by John Aislabie | Treasurer of the Navy; 1718–1720 | Succeeded by Sir George Byng |
| Preceded by Sir Roger Mostyn, Bt | Teller of the Exchequer; 1716–1718 | Succeeded by The Lord Onslow |
