= Jane Egerton, Countess of Bridgewater =

English wife of John Egerton, 3rd Earl of Bridgewater (1656-1716)

The Right Honourable The Countess of Bridgewater
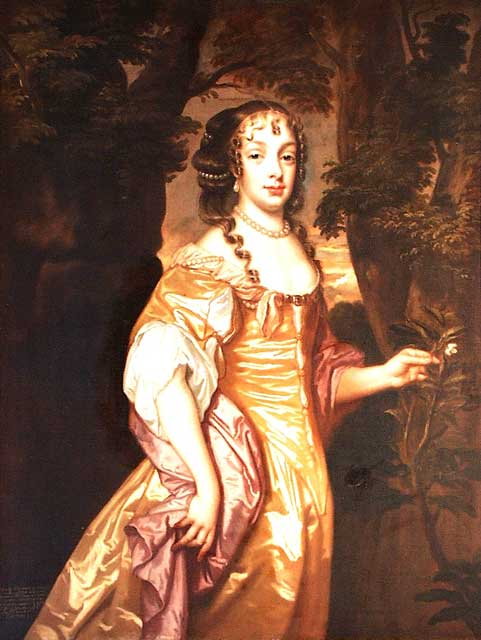
- Lady Jane (Anne) Powlett, later Countess of Bridgewater, c. 1670, circle of Sir Peter Lely

Countess of Bridgewater
- Born: 1656
- Died: 23 May 1716 (aged 59–60)
- Spouse: John Egerton, 3rd Earl of Bridgewater
- Issue: 9
- Father: Charles Paulet, 1st Duke of Bolton
- Mother: Mary Scrope

Jane Egerton, Countess of Bridgewater (née Paulet; c.1656 – 23 May 1716), was the second wife of John Egerton, 3rd Earl of Bridgewater. She was a daughter of Charles Paulet, 1st Duke of Bolton, by his second wife Mary Scrope.

Jane had nine children with the 3rd Earl:

- Charles Egerton, Viscount Brackley (7 May 1675 – April 1687)
- Lady Mary Egerton (14 May 1676 – 11 April 1704). Married William Byron, 4th Baron Byron
- Hon. Thomas Egerton (15 August 1679 – April 1687)
- Scroop Egerton, 1st Duke of Bridgewater (11 August 1681 – 11 January 1744/5)
- Hon. William Egerton (1684–1732), MP and soldier
- Hon. Henry Egerton, Bishop of Hereford (10 February 1689 – 1 April 1746), who married Elizabeth Ariana Bentinck, a daughter of William Bentinck, 1st Earl of Portland. They were the parents of John Egerton, Bishop of Durham.
- Hon. John Egerton (d. c.1707), a Page of Honour
- Hon. Charles Egerton (1694-1725), who married Catherine Greville, a sister of William Greville, 7th Baron Brooke.
- Lady Elizabeth Egerton, who married Thomas Paget, Lord Paget, a son of Henry Paget, 1st Earl of Uxbridge and his wife Mary Catesby. They were the parents of Henry Paget, 2nd Earl of Uxbridge.

The eldest son, Viscount Brackley, and his younger brother Thomas, died aged 11 and 7 respectively, along with their private tutor, in a fire which destroyed the family's London home of Bridgwater House. Both boys were buried on 14 April 1687 at Little Gaddesden, Hertfordshire. This left a younger brother, Scroop, as the heir to the earldom.

Following her husband's death, Jane was known by the title "Dowager Countess of Bridgewater". In 1724 a controversy arose over the distribution of property in her will, causing her daughter Elizabeth to instigate a court case.
