= Countess of Bridgewater =

The Countess of Bridgewater is a title used by the wife or widow of an Earl of Bridgewater. The Countesses of Bridgewater include:

== First creation (1538) ==
Person	Name	Born	Marriage	Became Countess of Bridgewater	Consort	Ceased to be Countess	Died	Notes
	Katherine Howard	1497		19 July 1538; Title creation	Henry Daubeney, 1st Earl of Bridgewater	8 May 1554		

== Second creation (1617) ==
Person	Name	Born	Marriage	Became Countess of Bridgewater	Consort	Ceased to be Countess	Died	Notes
	Frances Stanley	May 1583	27 June 1602	27 May 1617; Title creation	John Egerton, 1st Earl of Bridgewater	11 March 1636		
	Elizabeth Cavendish	1626	1641	4 December 1649; Husband's succession	John Egerton, 2nd Earl of Bridgewater	14 July 1663		English writer and daughter of William Cavendish, 1st Duke of Newcastle and Elizabeth Basset Howard
	Jane Paulet	1656	2 April 1673	26 October 1686; Husband's succession	John Egerton, 3rd Earl of Bridgewater	19 March 1701; Husband died	23 May 1716	daughter of Charles Paulet, 1st Duke of Bolton, and Mary Scrope
	Elizabeth Churchill	15 March 1687	9 February 1703		Scroop Egerton, 4th Earl of Bridgewater	22 March 1714		daughter of John Churchill, 1st Duke of Marlborough and Sarah Jenyns
	Rachel Russell	1707	4 August 1722		Scroop Egerton, 4th Earl of Bridgewater	11 January 1744; Husband died	1777	the only Duchess of Bridgewater (by marriage)
	Charlotte Haynes	20 November 1763	14 January 1783	8 March 1803; Husband's succession	John Egerton, 7th Earl of Bridgewater	21 October 1823	11 February 1849	English philanthropist and the last Countess of Bridgewater

== See also ==
- Elizabeth Egerton, Countess of Bridgewater (disambiguation)
