= 1874 Buckinghamshire by-election =

UK Parliamentary by-election

The 1874 Buckinghamshire by-election was fought on 17 March 1874. The by-election was fought due to the incumbent Conservative MP, Benjamin Disraeli, becoming the prime minister and First Lord of the Treasury and so having to resign his seat. It was retained by Disraeli, who was unopposed.
