= 1876 Buckinghamshire by-election =

UK parliamentary by-election

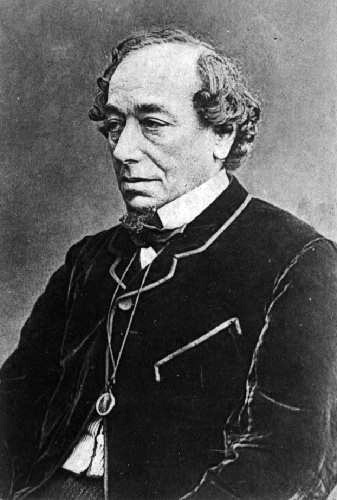
Benjamin Disraeli, whose elevation to the peerage triggered the by-election

The 1876 Buckinghamshire by-election, conducted on 22 September 1876, was held when Prime Minister Benjamin Disraeli was raised to the peerage as the Earl of Beaconsfield. It was won by the Conservative candidate, Thomas Fremantle, with a majority of 186 over the Liberal Party.

Buckinghamshire by-election, 1876
Party	Candidate	Votes	%	±%
Conservative	Hon. Thomas Fremantle	2,725	51.77	−24.1
Liberal	Hon. Rupert Carington	2,539	48.23	+26.1
Majority		186	3.54	−11.7
Turnout		5,264	72.38	+7.0
Conservative hold		Swing	-25.1	
