= Charles Egerton (MP for Wycombe) =

English politician

Sir Charles Egerton (ca. 1694–1725) was an 18th-century English politician.

He represented the seat of Chipping Wycombe in Buckinghamshire from 1722 until his death, on November 7th 1725.

== Biography ==
Egerton was born in London, the youngest son of John Egerton, 3rd Earl of Bridgewater and his wife Jane. He matriculated at New College, Oxford in February 1712, aged 17. His brother William Egerton was a member of parliament for Brackley, from 1708 to 1732.

Egerton married Catherine, daughter of Francis Greville and Lady Anne Wilmott.
