= William Stanhope (1702–1772) =

18th-century English politician

Hon. Sir William Stanhope KB (1702–1772), of Eythrope, Buckinghamshire, was an English landowner and opposition Whig politician, who sat in the House of Commons for 35 years between 1727 and 1768. Afflicted with deafness and ill-health, he travelled frequently and was often absent from Parliament.

== Early life ==
Stanhope was the second son of Philip Stanhope, 3rd Earl of Chesterfield and his wife Lady Elizabeth Savile, daughter of the Marquess of Halifax. He was the brother of Philip Dormer, Lord Stanhope Hon. Charles Stanhope, and Hon. John Stanhope. He married Susanna Rudge, daughter of John Rudge of Wheatfield, Oxfordshire on 27 April 1721. On this marriage, his father settled upon him the Buckinghamshire estates of the Dormer family, worth £8,000 a year. He was appointed Knight Companion of the Order of the Bath in 1725.

== Career ==
Stanhope stood for parliament at a by-election at Hertford on 23 January 1727, but was unsuccessful. Three days later on 26 January 1727 he was returned unopposed as Member of Parliament (MP) for a government seat at Lostwithiel. At the 1727 British general election he was returned as MP for Buckinghamshire and Aylesbury, and chose to sit for Buckinghamshire. There is no record of any votes by him before 1732. Then, like his brothers, he was a member of the Whig Opposition and he voted regularly against the Administration. He was returned again as MP for Buckinghamshire in a contest at the 1734 British general election, He attended the court of Frederick, Prince of Wales. As the Prince's mistress, Lady Archibald Hamilton, had filled the court with her relations, Stanhope one day addressed all the people he did not know there as Mr or Mrs Hamilton, whereupon he was given to understand that his presence there was not ‘quite agreeable’. Stanhope's first wife Susanna died on 5 October 1741 and he did not stand at the 1741 British general election.

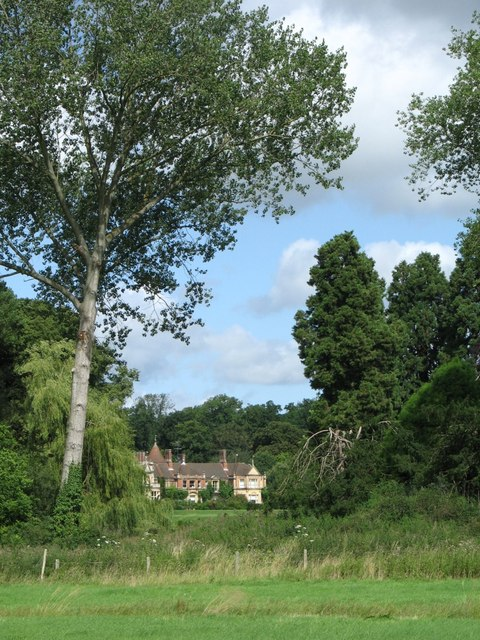
Pavilion in Eythrope Park

Stanhope married as his second wife Elizabeth Crowley, daughter of Sir Ambrose Crowley, MP and alderman of London on 29 May 1745. However she died on 25 February 1746. About this time, he started to improve Eythrope House, employing Isaac Ware to build new stables and follies in the garden and park. He adorned the grounds of Eythrope, his favourite seat, with ‘the imitation of ruins of an amphitheatre, castles, and turreted buildings.

Stanhope stood again at the 1747 British general election, when he was returned unopposed as an opposition Whig for Buckinghamshire. In 1748 he attacked the Grenvilles over a bill to transfer the summer assizes from Aylesbury to Buckingham. He appears to have restored his favour with the Prince of Wales, for he was marked as potential joint vice-treasurer of Ireland in the 2nd Lord Egmont’s lists of persons to receive office on Frederick’s accession.

Stanhope was returned unopposed for Buckinghamshire at the 1754 British general election, He enjoyed travelling despite ill health and increasing deafness and spent the next few years in Italy. He was back in England in September 1758, and, being anxious for a male heir, decided to marry again. He married Anne Hussey Delaval, daughter of Francis Blake Delaval as his third wife on 6 October 1759. Chesterfield wrote that by God’s good providence he found out a young woman of a retired disposition, and who had been bred up prudently under an old grandmother in the country; she hated and dreaded a London life, and chose to amuse herself at home with her books, her drawing, and her music. Stanhope was returned unopposed again at the 1761 British general election. He left England again for Italy shortly afterwards but the marriage did not survive the journey. Horace Walpole wrote to Mann ‘We sent you Sir William Stanhope and my Lady, a fond couple; you have returned them to us very different. When they came to Blackheath, he made her a low bow and said, ‘Madam, I hope I shall never see your face again.’ She replied, ‘Sir, I will take all the care that you never shall.’ A separation was mediated by Lord Chesterfield. Stanhope was almost completely deaf by this time and was increasingly absent from Parliament. He voted against Government over Wilkes on 15 November 1763, and over general warrants on 18 February 1764. He then went abroad again and was at Naples in May 1765, on friendly terms with Wilkes.. He did not appear in the division lists for 1766 to 1768, and he did not stand at the 1768 British general election.

== Death and legacy ==
In the last years of his life Stanhope spent much time in the south of France, and he died at Dijon on 7 May 1772. His only child, Elizabeth, a daughter by his first marriage, married Welbore Ellis. The house at Eythrope was demolished in 1810 to 1811 by Philip Stanhope, 5th Earl of Chesterfield. Two of Stanhope's buildings survive: the grotto by the lake and the bridge over the River Thame.

Parliament of Great Britain
Preceded by Henry Parsons; Sir Orlando Bridgeman, Bt	Member of Parliament for Lostwithiel; January–August 1727; With: Sir Orlando Bridgeman, Bt	Succeeded by Sir Orlando Bridgeman, Bt; Darell Trelawny
Preceded by Montague Garrard Drake; Sir Thomas Lee, 3rd Bt	Member of Parliament for Buckinghamshire; 1727–1741; With: Richard Hampden 1727–28; Sir Thomas Lee, 3rd Bt 1729–41	Succeeded by Richard Lowndes; Richard Grenville-Temple
Preceded by Richard Grenville-Temple; Richard Lowndes	Member of Parliament for Buckinghamshire; 1747–1768; With: Richard Lowndes	Succeeded by Richard Lowndes; The Earl Verney
