= Edmund Denton =

English politician

Sir Edmund Denton

Member of Parliament for Buckinghamshire
- In office 1708–1713

Member of Parliament for Buckingham
- In office 1698–1708

Personal details
- Born: 14 August 1679
- Died: 22 March 1740 (aged 60)
- Spouse: Mary Rowe
- Relatives: Alexander Denton (brother); Anthony Rowe (father-in-law)
- Education: Wadham College, Oxford

Sir Edmund Denton, 1st Baronet (25 October 1676 – 4 May 1714), of Hillesden, Buckinghamshire, was an English Whig politician who sat in the English and British House of Commons from 1698 to 1713.

== Biography ==
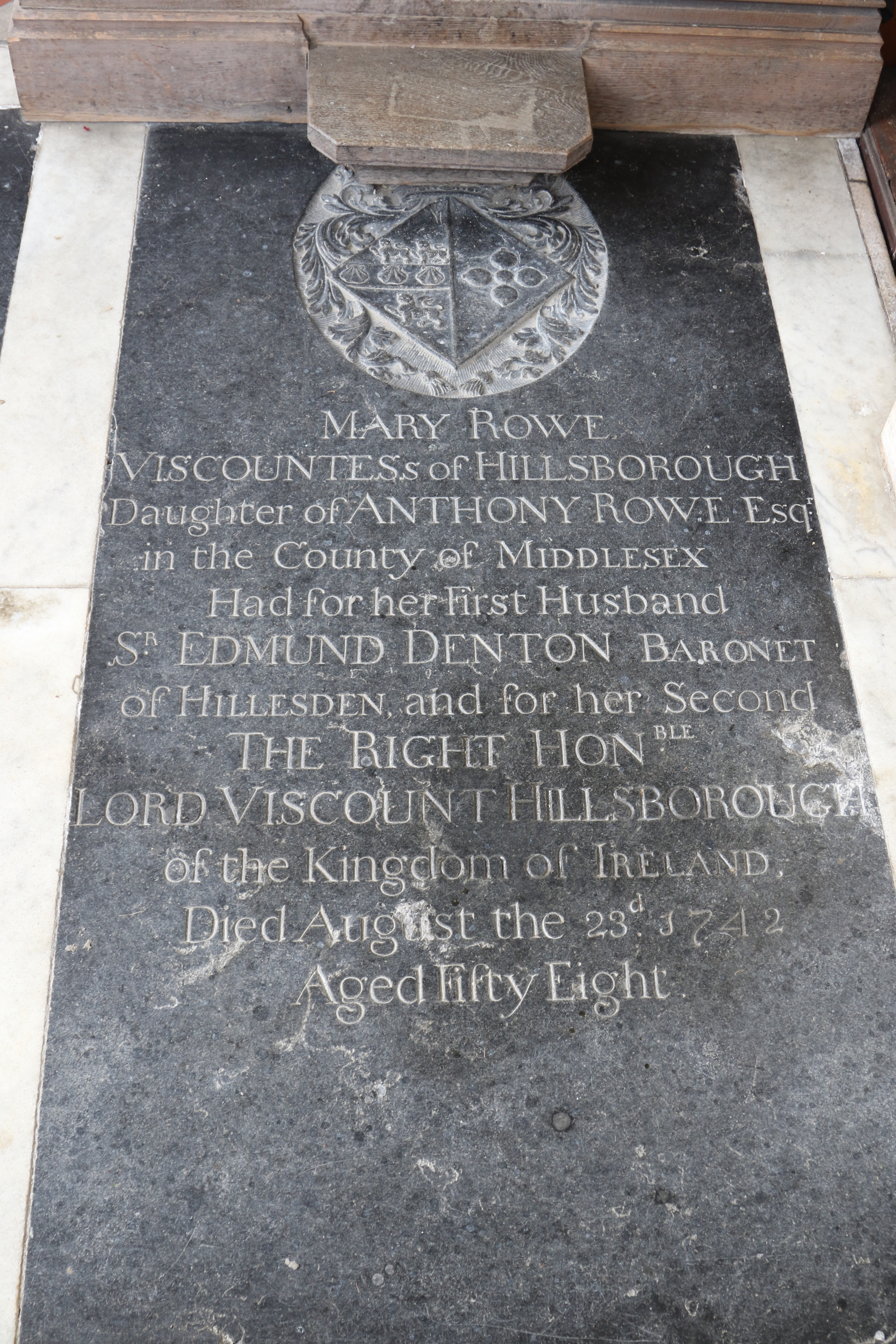
Ledger stone of Mary Rowe, wife of Sir Edmund Denton, 1st Baronet, All Saints' Church, Hillesden

Denton was baptized on 25 October 1676, the eldest son of Alexander Denton (1654–1698), MP for Buckingham, 1690–1698, and his wife, Esther (or Hester) Herman, daughter of Nicholas Herman of Middleton Stony. He was a member of a Cumberland family which had been granted the manor of Hillesdon by King Edward IV. He matriculated at Wadham College, Oxford in 1695, and was admitted at Middle Temple in 1697. He succeeded his father in 1698.

Denton was returned as Member of Parliament for Buckingham at the 1698 English general election. He was the elder brother of Alexander Denton, a judge.

On 12 May 1699, he was created a baronet, of Hillesdon in the County of Buckingham. He continued to represent Buckingham until the 1708 British general election, when he was returned as MP for Buckinghamshire, a seat he held until 1713.

Denton married, with a dowry of £10,000, Mary Rowe, eldest daughter and co-heiress of Anthony Rowe, (c.1641-1704) of Muswell Hill, Middlesex, MP. The marriage was childless. She survived him and remarried to Trevor Hill, 1st Viscount Hillsborough (1693–1742). He died on 4 May 1714, aged 37, when the baronetcy became extinct.

Parliament of England
Preceded by Alexander Denton; Sir Richard Temple, Bt	Member of Parliament for Buckingham; 1698–1707; With: Sir Richard Temple, Bt 1698–1702; Roger Price 1702–1705; Sir Richard Temple, Bt 1705; Browne Willis 1705–1707	Succeeded by Parliament of Great Britain
Parliament of Great Britain
Preceded by Parliament of England	Member of Parliament for Buckingham; 1707–1708; With: Browne Willis	Succeeded by Sir Richard Temple, Bt; Alexander Denton
Preceded by Sir Richard Temple, Bt; William Egerton	Member of Parliament for Buckinghamshire; 1708–1713; With: Richard Hampden 1708–1710; The Viscount Fermanagh 1710–1713	Succeeded by The Viscount Fermanagh; John Fleetwood
Baronetage of England
New creation	Baronet (of Hillesdon); 1699–1714	Extinct
