= John Fleetwood (MP) =

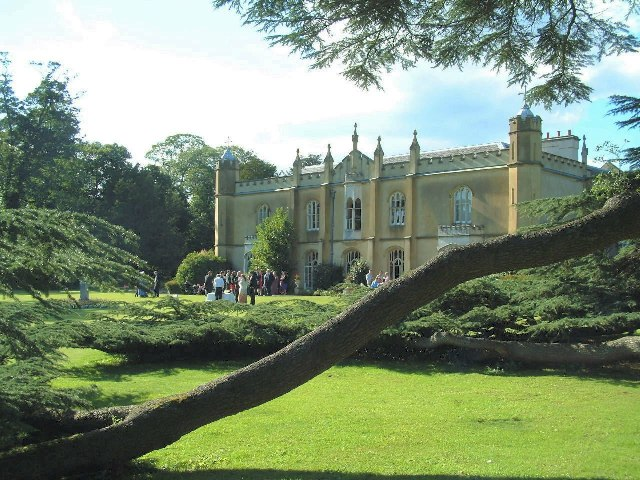
Missenden Abbey as rebuilt following 1985 fire

John Fleetwood (1686–1745), of Great Missenden, Buckinghamshire, was an English politician who sat in the House of Commons from 1713 to 1722.

Fleetwood was the eldest surviving son of William Fleetwood of Great Missenden Abbey and his second wife Sarah Bridgwood, daughter of Thomas Bridgwood, citizen and embroiderer of London. He matriculated at Oriel College, Oxford on 23 March 1702 aged 16.

Fleetwood was High Sheriff of Buckinghamshire for the year 1709 to 1710. At the 1713 general election he was returned as Member of Parliament for Buckinghamshire. He was returned unopposed in 1715, but did not stand in 1722.

Fleetwood married Elizabeth Seare, the daughter of Richard Seare of Great Missenden on 19 January 1724. He died in August 1745. He and his wife had no children and he was succeeded by his sister Mary.

Parliament of Great Britain
Preceded by Sir Edmund Denton, 1st Bt. The Viscount Fermanagh	Member of Parliament for Buckinghamshire; 1713–1722; With: The Viscount Fermanagh1713-1715; Richard Hampden 1715-1722	Succeeded by Montague Garrard Drake; Sir Thomas Lee, 3rd Bt.
