= Mary Paulet, Marchioness of Winchester =

British noblewoman (d. 1680)

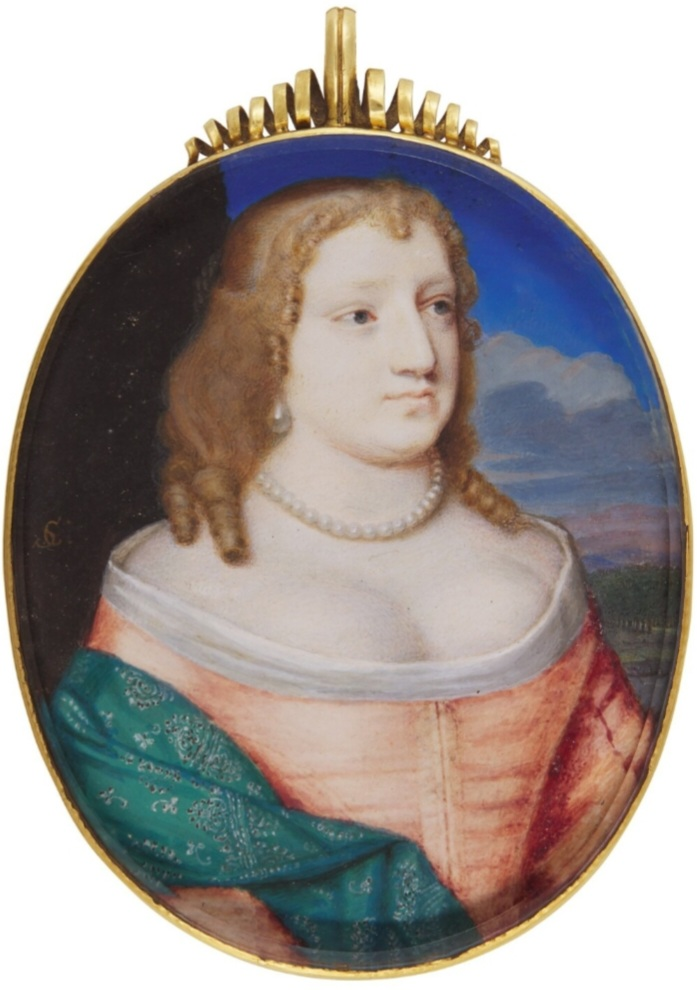
Portrait of a lady traditionally identified as Mary Paulet, 1660

Mary Paulet, Marchioness of Winchester (née Scrope; died 1 November 1680) was the second wife of Charles Paulet, 6th Marquess of Winchester. She was an illegitimate daughter of Emanuel Scrope, 1st Earl of Sunderland, by his mistress Martha Jeanes, or Janes, or Jones, alias San(d)ford. Although sometimes described as "Duchess of Bolton", she died before her husband was created a duke. Her son Charles succeeded his father as Duke of Bolton.

Mary's first husband was Henry Carey, Lord Leppington, whom she married in about 1646. A Royalist and the son of Henry Carey, 2nd Earl of Monmouth, he died in 1649, and they had no children.

On 12 February 1655, she married Charles Paulet at St. Dionis Backchurch, London. It was through his marriage to Mary that Paulet came into possession of the Bolton estates in North Yorkshire. They had four children in all:

- Jane Paulet (c.1656–23 May 1716), who married, on 2 April 1673, John Egerton, 3rd Earl of Bridgwater
- Mary Paulet
- Charles Paulet, 2nd Duke of Bolton (1661–1722)
- William Paulet (1666–1729)

Mary died at Moulins, Allier, France, and was buried at Wensley, Yorkshire.
