= Browne Willis =

English politician and antiquary (1682–1760)

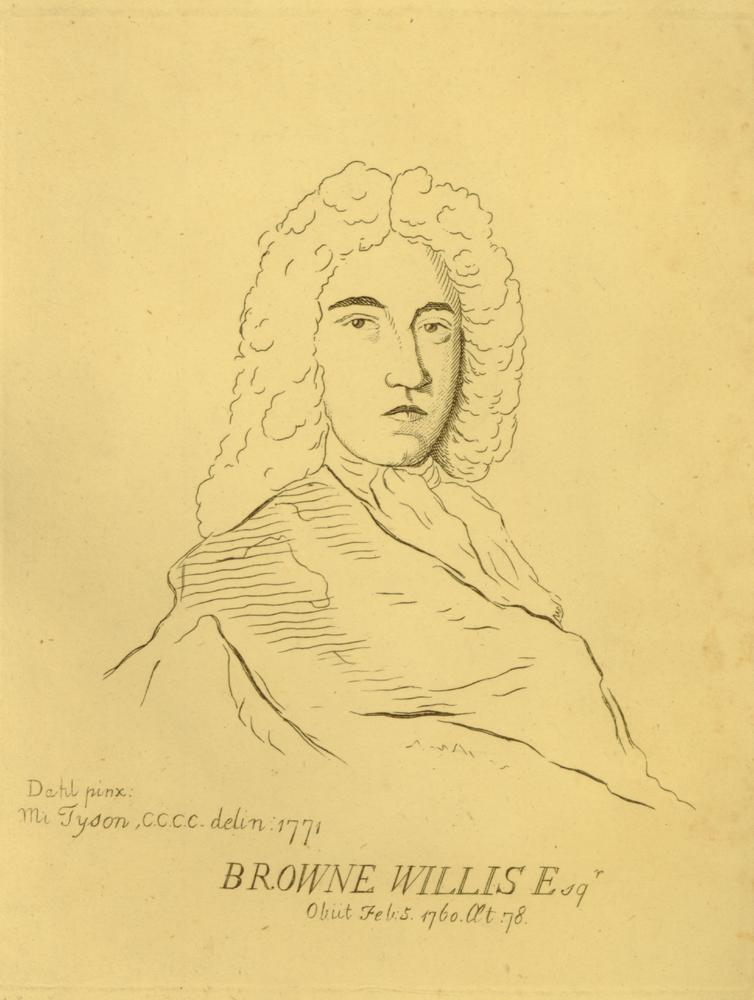
Etching (1771) by Michael Tyson after a portrait by Michael Dahl

Browne Willis (16 September 1682 – 5 February 1760) was a British antiquary, writer, numismatist and politician who sat in the House of Commons from 1705 to 1708.

== Early life ==
Willis was born at Blandford St Mary, Dorset, the eldest son of Thomas Willis of Bletchley, Buckinghamshire and his wife Alice Browne, daughter of Robert Browne of Frampton, Dorset. He was grandson of Dr Thomas Willis, the physician. He was educated at Beachampton School under the care of Abraham Freestone, and later at Westminster School. He attended Christ Church, Oxford and entered the Inner Temple in 1700.

In 1707 he married Katherine Eliot, the daughter of Daniel Eliot.

He joined the recently reformed Society of Antiquaries in 1717–18.

== Political career ==
In 1705, Willis was elected Member of Parliament for Buckingham. He held the seat until 1708.

== Published works ==
His published works are:

- Notitia Parliamentaria, vol. 1 (1715)
- Survey of St David’s Cathedral (1716)
- Notitia Parliamentaria, vol. 2 (1716)
- The Whole Duty of Man, Abridged for the Benefit of the Poorer Sort (1717)
- Mitred Abbies, vol. 1 (1718)
- An Survey of the Cathedral-Church of Landaff (1718 or 1719)
- Mitred Abbies, vol. 2 (1719)
- Survey of St Asaph (1720)
- Reflecting Sermons Consider'd; occasion'd by several discourses deliver'd by E. Wells (1720)
- Survey of Bangor Cathedral (1721)
- Survey of York, Durham, Carlisle, Chester, Man, Lichfield, Hereford, Worcester, Gloucester, and Bristol (1727)
- Survey of Lincoln, Ely, Oxford, and Peterborough (1730)
- A Table of the Gold Coins of the Kings of England (1733)
- Parochiale Anglicanum (1733)
- Notitia Parliamentaria, vol. 3 (1750)
- To the Patrons of Ecclesiastical Livings (1752)
- History of the Town, Hundred, and Deanery of Buckingham (1755)

== St Martin's Church, Fenny Stratford ==
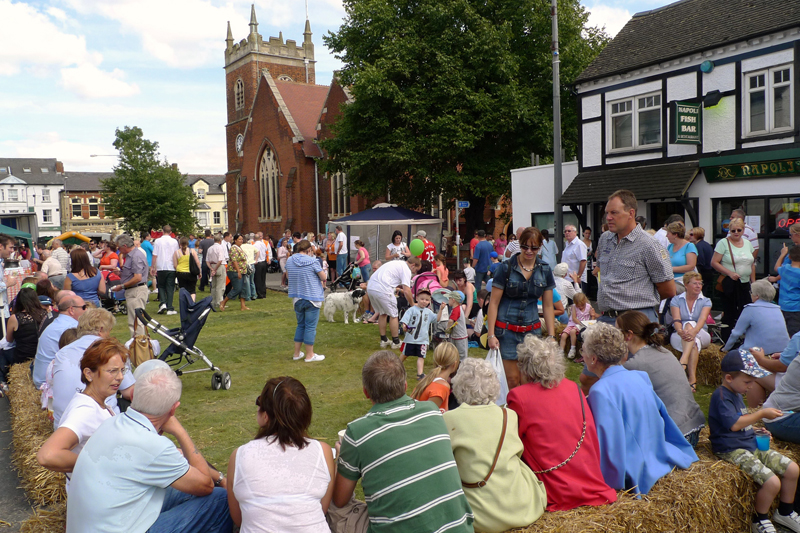
St Martin's Church, Fenny Stratford Fenny Poppers Festival, 23 August 2009 On this festival day in August, Aylesbury Street is closed to traffic and a short section of it is grassed over as a picnic area.

Between 1724 and 1730, Browne Willis built St. Martin's Church on the site of the old Chantry Chapel of St. Margaret and St. Catherine at Fenny Stratford. He erected the church as a memorial to his grandfather Dr. Thomas Willis, a famous physician who lived in St. Martin's Lane in the parish of St. Martin-in-the-Fields in London and died on St. Martin's Day, 11 November 1675.

=== The Fenny Poppers ===
Browne Willis arranged for a sermon to be preached in his memory at St. Martin's Church every St. Martin's Day, for which a fee was payable. He celebrated the occasion with a dinner for local clergy and gentry. The firing of the "Fenny Poppers", six small cannon, dates from this period, although there is no record of their first use. In 1740 Browne Willis bought a house in Aylesbury Street, Fenny Stratford and the rent from this was used to pay for the sermon and gunpowder for the Fenny Poppers. The traditions were continued after Willis's death in 1760.

The six poppers were re-cast in 1859 after one of them burst. They are still in use today.

Many sites have been used for this battery. These include; the Canal Wharf, land behind the Church, St, Martin's Hall, the Churchyard and now the Leon Recreation Ground, which was once part of the lands belonging to the Chantry.

The poppers each weigh about 19 pounds (8.6 kg). The bore, 6 by 1.75 inches (152 mm × 44 mm) will take up to 1 ounce (28 g) of gunpowder, which is plugged with well-rammed newspaper. They are fired three times on St. Martin's Day: noon, 2pm and 4pm. There is no connection with Remembrance Day, which is also on 11 November.

The poppers are also fired to mark special occasions, including the death of Queen Victoria, the start of the second millennium, the 100th birthday of Queen Elizabeth the Queen Mother, and the Diamond Jubilee of Queen Elizabeth II.

== Notes ==
Parliament of England
| Preceded by Sir Edmund Denton, Bt; Sir Richard Temple, Bt | Member of Parliament for Buckingham; 1705–1707; With: Sir Edmund Denton, Bt | Succeeded by Parliament of Great Britain |
Parliament of Great Britain
| Preceded by Parliament of England | Member of Parliament for Buckingham; 1707–1708; With: Sir Edmund Denton, Bt | Succeeded by Sir Richard Temple, Bt; Alexander Denton |
