= Buckinghamshire (constituency) =

Parliamentary constituency in the United Kingdom 1801-1885

- Former county constituency for the House of Commons

1265–1885
- Seats: two
- Replaced by: Aylesbury, Buckingham and Wycombe

Buckinghamshire is a former United Kingdom Parliamentary constituency. It was a constituency of the House of Commons of the Parliament of England then of the Parliament of Great Britain from 1707 to 1800 and of the Parliament of the United Kingdom from 1801 to 1885.

Its most prominent member was Prime Minister Benjamin Disraeli.

== Boundaries and boundary changes ==
This county constituency consisted of the historic county of Buckinghamshire, in south-eastern England to the north-west of the modern Greater London region. Its southern boundary was the River Thames. See History of Buckinghamshire for maps of the historic county and details about it.

The county returned two knights of the shire until 1832 and three 1832–1885. The place of election for the county was at the county town of Aylesbury. Aylesbury replaced Buckingham as the county town in 1529.

The county, up to 1885, also contained the borough constituencies of Amersham (originally enfranchised with 2 seats from 1300, revived 1625, disenfranchised 1832), Aylesbury (originally enfranchised with 2 seats from 1302, revived 1554), Buckingham (2 seats from 1529, 1 seat from 1868), Chipping Wycombe (2 seats from 1300, 1 seat from 1868), Great Marlow (2 seats 1625–1868, 1 seat from 1868) and Wendover (2 seats 1625–1832, disenfranchised 1832).

In 1885 the county was split into three single-member county divisions. These were Aylesbury, Buckingham and Wycombe.

Aylesbury, Buckingham, Chipping Wycombe and Great Marlow were disenfranchised as borough constituencies. There were no remaining Parliamentary boroughs in the county from 1885.

== Members of Parliament ==
Constituency created (1265): See Simon de Montfort's Parliament for further details. Knights of the shire are known to have been summoned to most Parliaments from 1290 (19th Parliament of King Edward I of England) and to every one from 1320 (19th Parliament of King Edward II of England).

=== Knights of the shire 1660–1832 ===
Year	First member	First party	Second member	Second party
1656	William Hampden			
April 1660	Thomas Tyrrell		Sir William Bowyer, 1st Bt.	
August 1660	William Tyringham		Sir William Bowyer, 1st Bt.	
1679	Hon. Thomas Wharton	Whig	John Hampden	
1681	Hon. Thomas Wharton	Whig	Richard Hampden	Whig
1685	Hon. Thomas Wharton	Whig	Viscount Brackley	Whig
1689	Hon. Thomas Wharton	Whig	Sir Thomas Lee, 1st Bt.	
1690	Hon. Thomas Wharton	Whig	Richard Hampden	Whig
1695	Hon. Thomas Wharton	Whig	Sir Richard Atkins, 2nd Bt.	
February 1696	The Viscount Newhaven	Tory	Sir Richard Atkins, 2nd Bt.	
December 1696	The Viscount Newhaven	Tory	Henry Neale	
1698	The Viscount Newhaven	Tory	Goodwin Wharton	Whig
1701	Robert Dormer		Goodwin Wharton	Whig
1702	The Viscount Newhaven	Tory	Goodwin Wharton	Whig
1704	The Viscount Newhaven	Tory	Sir Richard Temple, 4th Bt.	Whig
1705	Robert Dormer		Sir Richard Temple, 4th Bt.	Whig
1706	William Egerton		Sir Richard Temple, 4th Bt.	Whig
1708	Sir Edmund Denton, 1st Bt.		Richard Hampden	
1710	Sir Edmund Denton, 1st Bt.		The Viscount Fermanagh	Tory
1713	John Fleetwood		The Viscount Fermanagh	Tory
1715	John Fleetwood		Richard Hampden	
1722	Montague Garrard Drake		Sir Thomas Lee, 3rd Bt.	
1727	Sir William Stanhope		Richard Hampden (died 1728)	
1729	Sir William Stanhope		Sir Thomas Lee, 3rd Bt.	
1741	Richard Grenville	Whig	Richard Lowndes	
1747	Sir William Stanhope		Richard Lowndes	
1768	The Earl Verney	Whig	Richard Lowndes	
1774	The Earl Verney	Whig	George Grenville	Whig
1779	The Earl Verney	Whig	Thomas Grenville	Whig
1784	William Grenville	Tory	Sir John Aubrey, 6th Bt.	Tory
June 1790	William Grenville	Tory	The Earl Verney	Whig
December 1790	James Grenville	Whig	The Earl Verney	Whig
1791	James Grenville	Whig	Marquess of Titchfield	Whig
1797	Earl Temple	Tory	Marquess of Titchfield	Whig
1810	Earl Temple	Tory	William Selby Lowndes	Whig
1813	Thomas Grenville		William Selby Lowndes	Whig
1818	Marquess of Chandos	Tory	William Selby Lowndes	Whig
1820	Marquess of Chandos	Tory	Robert Smith	Whig
1831	Marquess of Chandos	Tory	John Smith	Whig
1832	Third member added			

=== Knights of the shire 1832–1885 ===
Election	First member	First party	Second member	Second party	Third member	Third party
1832	Richard Temple-Grenville	Tory	John Smith	Whig	Sir George Dashwood, 5th Bt.	Whig
1834	Richard Temple-Grenville	Conservative	John Smith	Whig	Sir George Dashwood, 5th Bt.	Whig
1835	Richard Temple-Grenville	Conservative	Sir William Young, 4th Bt	Conservative	James Backwell Praed	Conservative
1837 by-election	Richard Temple-Grenville	Conservative	Sir William Young, 4th Bt	Conservative	George Simon Harcourt	Conservative
1839 by-election	Caledon Du Pré	Conservative	Sir William Young, 4th Bt	Conservative	George Simon Harcourt	Conservative
1841	Caledon Du Pré	Conservative	Sir William Young, 4th Bt	Conservative	Charles Scott-Murray	Conservative
1842 by-election	Caledon Du Pré	Conservative	Hon. William FitzMaurice	Conservative	Charles Scott-Murray	Conservative
1845 by-election	Caledon Du Pré	Conservative	Hon. William FitzMaurice	Conservative	Christopher Tower	Conservative
1847	Caledon Du Pré	Conservative	Hon. Charles Cavendish	Whig	Benjamin Disraeli	Conservative
1857	Caledon Du Pré	Conservative	William Cavendish	Whig	Benjamin Disraeli	Conservative
1859	Caledon Du Pré	Conservative	William Cavendish	Liberal	Benjamin Disraeli	Conservative
1863 by-election	Caledon Du Pré	Conservative	Robert Harvey	Conservative	Benjamin Disraeli	Conservative
1868	Caledon Du Pré	Conservative	Nathaniel Lambert	Liberal	Benjamin Disraeli	Conservative
1874	Sir Robert Harvey, Bt	Conservative	Nathaniel Lambert	Liberal	Benjamin Disraeli	Conservative
1876 by-election	Sir Robert Harvey, Bt	Conservative	Nathaniel Lambert	Liberal	Hon. Thomas Fremantle	Conservative
1880	Sir Robert Harvey, Bt	Conservative	Rupert Carington	Liberal	Hon. Thomas Fremantle	Conservative
1885	Constituency divided. See Aylesbury, Buckingham and Wycombe					

== Elections ==
In multi-member elections the bloc voting system was used. Voters could cast a vote for one or two (or three in three-member elections 1832–1868) candidates, as they chose. The leading candidates with the largest number of votes were elected. In 1868 the limited vote was introduced, which restricted an individual elector to using one or two votes, in elections to fill three seats.

In by-elections, to fill a single seat, the first past the post system applied.

After 1832, when registration of voters was introduced, a turnout figure is given for contested elections. In three-member elections, when the exact number of participating voters is unknown, this is calculated by dividing the number of votes by three (to 1868) and two thereafter. To the extent that electors did not use all their votes this will be an underestimate of turnout.

Where a party had more than one candidate in one or both of a pair of successive elections change is calculated for each individual candidate, otherwise change is based on the party vote.

Candidates for whom no party has been identified are classified as Non Partisan. The candidate might have been associated with a party or faction in Parliament or consider himself to belong to a particular political tradition. Political parties before the 19th century were not as cohesive or organised as they later became. Contemporary commentators (even the reputed leaders of parties or factions) in the 18th century did not necessarily agree who the party supporters were. The traditional parties, which had arisen in the late 17th century, became increasingly irrelevant to politics in the 18th century (particularly after 1760), although for some contests in some constituencies party labels were still used. It was only towards the end of the century that party labels began to acquire some meaning again, although this process was by no means complete for several more generations.'

Sources: The results for elections 1660-1790 were taken from the History of Parliament Trust publications. The results are based on Stooks Smith from 1790 until the 1832 United Kingdom general election and Craig from 1832. Where Stooks Smith gives additional information after 1832 this is indicated in a note.

1660-70s – 1680-90s – 1700-10s – 1720-30s – 1740-50s – 1760-70s – 1780-90s – 1800-10s – 1820-30s – 1840-50s – 1860-80s

=== Elections in the 1660-70s ===
General election 11 April 1660: Buckinghamshire (2 seats)
Party	Candidate	Votes	%	±%
Non Partisan	William Bowyer	Unopposed	N/A	N/A
Non Partisan	Thomas Tyrrell	Unopposed	N/A	N/A

- Appointment of Tyrrell as a Judge

By-election 22 August 1660: Buckinghamshire
Party	Candidate	Votes	%	±%
Non Partisan	William Tyringham	Unopposed	N/A	N/A
Non Partisan hold		Swing	N/A	

General election 1661: Buckinghamshire (2 seats)
Party	Candidate	Votes	%	±%
Non Partisan	William Bowyer	1,499	27.58	N/A
Non Partisan	William Tyringham	1,379	25.37	N/A
Non Partisan	Richard Hampden	1,315	24.20	N/A
Non Partisan	R. Winwood	1,242	22.85	N/A

General election 5 February 1679: Buckinghamshire (2 seats)
Party	Candidate	Votes	%	±%
Non Partisan	John Hampden	Unopposed	N/A	N/A
Whig	Thomas Wharton	Unopposed	N/A	N/A

=== Elections in the 1680-90s ===
General election 1680: Buckinghamshire (2 seats)
Party	Candidate	Votes	%	±%
Non Partisan	John Hampden	Unopposed	N/A	N/A
Whig	Thomas Wharton	Unopposed	N/A	N/A

General election 2 February 1681: Buckinghamshire (2 seats)
Party	Candidate	Votes	%	±%
Whig	Richard Hampden	Unopposed	N/A	N/A
Whig	Thomas Wharton	Unopposed	N/A	N/A

General election 10 April 1685: Buckinghamshire (2 seats)
Party	Candidate	Votes	%	±%
Whig	John Egerton	2,430	44.66	N/A
Whig	Thomas Wharton	1,804	33.16	N/A
Non Partisan	T. Hackett	1,207	22.18	N/A

General election 10 January 1689: Buckinghamshire (2 seats)
Party	Candidate	Votes	%	±%
Non Partisan	Thomas Lee	Unopposed	N/A	N/A
Whig	Thomas Wharton	Unopposed	N/A	N/A

General election 19 February 1690: Buckinghamshire (2 seats)
Party	Candidate	Votes	%	±%
Whig	Richard Hampden	Unopposed	N/A	N/A
Whig	Thomas Wharton	Unopposed	N/A	N/A

General election 30 October 1695: Buckinghamshire (2 seats)
Party	Candidate	Votes	%	±%
Non Partisan	Richard Atkins	Unopposed	N/A	N/A
Whig	Thomas Wharton	Unopposed	N/A	N/A

- Succession of Wharton as 5th Baron Wharton

By-election 24 February 1696: Buckinghamshire
Party	Candidate	Votes	%	±%
Tory	William Cheyne	Unopposed	N/A	N/A
Tory gain from Whig		Swing	N/A	

- Note (February 1696): The William Cheyne succeeded his father as the 2nd Viscount Newhaven, a Scottish peerage, in 1698.
- Death of Atkins

By-election 31 December 1696: Buckinghamshire
Party	Candidate	Votes	%	±%
Non Partisan	Henry Neale	Unopposed	N/A	N/A
Non Partisan hold		Swing	N/A	

General election 27 August 1698: Buckinghamshire (2 seats)
Party	Candidate	Votes	%	±%
Tory	William Cheyne	Unopposed	N/A	N/A
Whig	Goodwin Wharton	Unopposed	N/A	N/A

=== Elections in the 1700-10s ===
General election February 1701: Buckinghamshire (2 seats)
Party	Candidate	Votes	%	±%
Tory	William Cheyne	Unopposed	N/A	N/A
Whig	Goodwin Wharton	Unopposed	N/A	N/A

General election 10 December 1701: Buckinghamshire (2 seats)
Party	Candidate	Votes	%	±%
Non Partisan	Robert Dormer	Unopposed	N/A	N/A
Whig	Goodwin Wharton	Unopposed	N/A	N/A

General election 22 July 1702: Buckinghamshire (2 seats)
Party	Candidate	Votes	%	±%
Tory	William Cheyne	Unopposed	N/A	N/A
Whig	Goodwin Wharton	Unopposed	N/A	N/A

- Death of Wharton

By-election 8 November 1704: Buckinghamshire
Party	Candidate	Votes	%	±%
Whig	Richard Temple	Unopposed	N/A	N/A
Whig gain from Nonpartisan		Swing	N/A	

General election 24 May 1705: Buckinghamshire (2 seats)
Party	Candidate	Votes	%	±%
Non Partisan	Robert Dormer	Unopposed	N/A	N/A
Whig	Richard Temple	Unopposed	N/A	N/A

- Appointment of Dormer as a Justice of the Court of Common Pleas

By-election 27 February 1706: Buckinghamshire
Party	Candidate	Votes	%	±%
Non Partisan	William Egerton	Unopposed	N/A	N/A
Non Partisan hold		Swing	N/A	

General election 18 May 1708: Buckinghamshire (2 seats)
Party	Candidate	Votes	%	±%
Non Partisan	Edmund Denton	Unopposed	N/A	N/A
Non Partisan	Richard Hampden	Unopposed	N/A	N/A

- Note (1708): Possible classification - Hampden (W)

General election 4 October 1710: Buckinghamshire (2 seats)
Party	Candidate	Votes	%	±%
Non Partisan	Edmund Denton	Unopposed	N/A	N/A
Tory	John Verney	Unopposed	N/A	N/A

General election 2 September 1713: Buckinghamshire (2 seats)
Party	Candidate	Votes	%	±%
Tory	John Verney	Unopposed	N/A	N/A
Non Partisan	John Fleetwood	Unopposed	N/A	N/A

- Note (1713): Possible classification - Fleetwood (T)

General election 2 February 1715: Buckinghamshire (2 seats)
Party	Candidate	Votes	%	±%
Non Partisan	John Fleetwood	Unopposed	N/A	N/A
Non Partisan	Richard Hampden	Unopposed	N/A	N/A

- Note (1715): Possible classification - Fleetwood (T), Hampden (W)
- Appointment of Hampden as a Teller of the Exchequer

By-election 4 July 1716: Buckinghamshire
Party	Candidate	Votes	%	±%
Non Partisan	Richard Hampden	Unopposed	N/A	N/A
Non Partisan hold		Swing	N/A	

- Note (1716): Possible classification - Hampden (W)
- Appointment of Hampden as Treasurer of the Navy

By-election 9 April 1717: Buckinghamshire
Party	Candidate	Votes	%	±%
Non Partisan	Richard Hampden	Unopposed	N/A	N/A
Non Partisan hold		Swing	N/A	

- Note (1717): Possible classification - Hampden (W)

=== Elections in the 1720-30s ===
General election 4 April 1722: Buckinghamshire (2 seats)
Party	Candidate	Votes	%	±%
Non Partisan	Montague Garrard Drake	2,441	37.21	N/A
Non Partisan	Thomas Lee	2,415	36.81	N/A
Non Partisan	Fleetwood Dormer	1,704	25.98	N/A

- Note (1722): Possible classification - Drake (T), Lee & Dormer (W)

General election 16 August 1727: Buckinghamshire (2 seats)
Party	Candidate	Votes	%	±%
Non Partisan	Hon. William Stanhope	2,310	39.39	N/A
Non Partisan	Richard Hampden	1,903	32.45	N/A
Non Partisan	William Gore	1,651	28.16	N/A

- Note (1727): Possible classification - Stanhope & Hampden (W), Gore (T)
- Death of Hampden

By-election 29 January 1729: Buckinghamshire
Party	Candidate	Votes	%	±%
Non Partisan	Thomas Lee	Unopposed	N/A	N/A
Non Partisan hold		Swing	N/A	

- Note (1729): Possible classification - Lee (W)

General election 1734: Buckinghamshire (2 seats)
Party	Candidate	Votes	%	±%
Non Partisan	William Stanhope	2,414	43.96	N/A
Non Partisan	Thomas Lee	1,763	32.11	N/A
Non Partisan	Richard Lowndes	1,314	23.93	N/A

- Note (1734): Possible classification - Stanhope & Lee (W), Lowndes (T)

=== Elections in the 1740-50s ===
General election 6 May 1741: Buckinghamshire (2 seats)
Party	Candidate	Votes	%	±%
Whig	Richard Grenville	Unopposed	N/A	N/A
Non Partisan	Richard Lowndes	Unopposed	N/A	N/A

- Note (1741): Possible classification - Lowndes (T)

General election 6 July 1747: Buckinghamshire (2 seats)
Party	Candidate	Votes	%	±%
Non Partisan	Richard Lowndes	Unopposed	N/A	N/A
Non Partisan	Hon. William Stanhope	Unopposed	N/A	N/A

- Note (1747): Possible classification - Lowndes (T), Stanhope (W)

General election 17 April 1754: Buckinghamshire (2 seats)
Party	Candidate	Votes	%	±%
Non Partisan	Richard Lowndes	Unopposed	N/A	N/A
Non Partisan	William Stanhope	Unopposed	N/A	N/A

- Note (1754): Possible classification - Lowndes (T), Stanhope (W)

=== Elections in the 1760-70s ===
General election 4 April 1761: Buckinghamshire (2 seats)
Party	Candidate	Votes	%	±%
Non Partisan	Richard Lowndes	Unopposed	N/A	N/A
Non Partisan	Hon. William Stanhope	Unopposed	N/A	N/A

- Note (1761): Possible classification - Lowndes (T), Stanhope (W)

General election 28 March 1768: Buckinghamshire (2 seats)
Party	Candidate	Votes	%	±%
Non Partisan	Richard Lowndes	Unopposed	N/A	N/A
Whig	Ralph Verney	Unopposed	N/A	N/A

- Note (1768): Possible classification - Lowndes (T)

General election 19 October 1774: Buckinghamshire (2 seats)
Party	Candidate	Votes	%	±%
Whig	George Grenville	Unopposed	N/A	N/A
Whig	Ralph Verney	Unopposed	N/A	N/A

- Succession of Grenville as 3rd Earl Temple

By-election 25 October 1779: Buckinghamshire
Party	Candidate	Votes	%	±%
Whig	Thomas Grenville	Unopposed	N/A	N/A
Whig hold		Swing	N/A	

=== Elections in the 1780-90s ===
General election 13 September 1780: Buckinghamshire (2 seats)
Party	Candidate	Votes	%	±%
Whig	Thomas Grenville	Unopposed	N/A	N/A
Whig	Ralph Verney	Unopposed	N/A	N/A

General election 21 April 1784: Buckinghamshire (2 seats)
Party	Candidate	Votes	%	±%
Whig	William Grenville	2,261	39.55	N/A
Non Partisan	John Aubrey	1,740	30.44	N/A
Whig	Ralph Verney	1,716	30.02	N/A

- Note (1784): Poll 13 days. 3,548 voted. Possible classification for Aubrey (T). (Source: Stooks Smith)
- An alternative interpretation is that Aubrey was a supporter of Pitt (who called himself a Whig, although retrospectively usually classified as a Tory). Aubrey had very clearly identified himself with the opposition to the Fox-North coalition. (Source: Davis)
- Appointment of Grenville as Secretary of State for the Home Department

By-election 19 June 1789: Buckinghamshire
Party	Candidate	Votes	%	±%
Whig	William Grenville	Unopposed	N/A	N/A
Whig hold		Swing	N/A	

General election 22 June 1790: Buckinghamshire (2 seats)
Party	Candidate	Votes	%	±%
Tory	William Bentinck	Unopposed	N/A	N/A
Whig	Ralph Verney	Unopposed	N/A	N/A

- Death of Verney

By-election 27 December 1790: Buckinghamshire
Party	Candidate	Votes	%	±%
Non Partisan	James Grenville	Unopposed	N/A	N/A
Nonpartisan gain from Whig		Swing	N/A	

General election 1 June 1796: Buckinghamshire (2 seats)
Party	Candidate	Votes	%	±%
Non Partisan	James Grenville	Unopposed	N/A	N/A
Tory	William Bentinck	Unopposed	N/A	N/A

- Resignation of Grenville

By-election 30 June 1797: Buckinghamshire
Party	Candidate	Votes	%	±%
Non Partisan	Earl Temple	Unopposed	N/A	N/A
Non Partisan hold		Swing	N/A	

=== Elections in the 1800-10s ===
General election July 1802: Buckinghamshire (2 seats)
Party	Candidate	Votes	%	±%
Non Partisan	Earl Temple	Unopposed	N/A	N/A
Tory	William Bentinck	Unopposed	N/A	N/A

- Note (1802): Identifying a definitive party label for Temple and Titchfield is difficult. Stooks Smith considered Temple a Tory and Titchfield a Whig, but he may not be reliable for Bucks candidates allegiances before about 1818. Both knights of the shire were members of traditional Whig families and were closely related to one or more Whig Prime Ministers. Temple was a member of the Grenville family, which had supported their cousin William Pitt the Younger during his first premiership 1783-1801. Former Bucks MP (and uncle of Earl Temple) William Grenville, 1st Baron Grenville had become closer to Charles James Fox and his faction of opposition Whigs since leaving office with Pitt in 1801. This may have affected the political position of his relatives like Earl Temple. Titchfield was the son of William Cavendish-Bentinck, 3rd Duke of Portland who had been the Whig Prime Minister of the Fox-North Coalition, in office before Pitt. However Portland had split his Whig faction and broken with the pre-eminent opposition Whig leader in the House of Commons, Charles James Fox, over the attitude to be taken to the French Revolution. Portland joined Pitt's cabinet in 1794. Pitt called himself a Whig, although his followers came from both traditional Whig and Tory families. Titchfield, when he was first elected for the county in 1791, had been brought forward as a candidate by the Buckinghamshire Independent Club. This club had supported the late Earl Verney, and were definitely a Whig organisation. At that time Titchfield's father was the leader of the largest Whig faction in opposition to Pitt's Ministry. However Davis does imply that Titchfield himself was a Tory, which is how he has been classified in this article. In the absence of a clear indication of whether Temple considered himself a Whig or Tory at this stage of his career, he has been classified as a Non Partisan member for this article.

General election 1806: Buckinghamshire (2 seats)
Party	Candidate	Votes	%	±%
Non Partisan	Earl Temple	Unopposed	N/A	N/A
Tory	William Bentinck	Unopposed	N/A	N/A

- Note (1806): As for 1802 save that following Pitt's death William Wyndham Grenville, 1st Baron Grenville, who had not joined Pitt's second Ministry in 1804, become Prime Minister of the Ministry of All the Talents in 1806. This may have led the Grenvilles, in retrospect, to continue to be regarded as Whig when Pitt and other groups of his supporters came to be called Tory after Pitt's death.

General election 11 May 1807: Buckinghamshire (2 seats)
Party	Candidate	Votes	%	±%
Non Partisan	Earl Temple	Unopposed	N/A	N/A
Tory	William Bentinck	Unopposed	N/A	N/A

- Note (1807): As before save that in 1807 the Duke of Portland had formed a Tory administration (although he claimed to be the Whig Prime Minister of a Tory Ministry). In retrospect Portland has been regarded as a Tory at the time of his second Ministry.
- Succession of Titchfield as 4th Duke of Portland

By-election 3 January 1810: Buckinghamshire
Party	Candidate	Votes	%	±%
Non Partisan	William Selby Lowndes	Unopposed	N/A	N/A
Nonpartisan gain from Tory				

- Note (1810): Possible party for Selby Lowndes is Whig (source: Stooks Smith), but given his conservative religious views and support for Henry Addington, 1st Viscount Sidmouth's anti-dissenter policy it may be best to regard him as a member of a traditional Whig family who was moving towards being a nineteenth century Tory. He has been classified as Non Partisan for the purpose of this article.

General election 1812: Buckinghamshire (2 seats)
Party	Candidate	Votes	%	±%
Non Partisan	William Selby Lowndes	Unopposed	N/A	N/A
Non Partisan	Earl Temple	Unopposed	N/A	N/A

- Succession of Temple as 2nd Marquess of Buckingham

By-election 6 March 1813: Buckinghamshire
Party	Candidate	Votes	%	±%
Non Partisan	Thomas Grenville	Unopposed	N/A	N/A
Non Partisan hold				

- Note (1813): Grenville was the uncle of the 2nd Marquess of Buckingham (formerly Earl Temple MP). The same factors noted for Temple lead to Thomas Grenville being classified as Non Partisan for the purpose of this article. Stooks Smith however classifies him as Tory and he was of the same generation as his brother William Grenville, 1st Baron Grenville classified by Stooks Smith as a Tory and in this article as a Whig.

General election 22 June 1818: Buckinghamshire (2 seats)
Party	Candidate	Votes	%	±%
Non Partisan	William Selby Lowndes	Unopposed	N/A	N/A
Tory	Earl Temple	Unopposed	N/A	N/A

=== Elections in the 1820-30s ===
General election 13 March 1820: Buckinghamshire (2 seats)
Party	Candidate	Votes	%	±%
Whig	Robert Smith	Unopposed	N/A	N/A
Tory	Richard Temple-Grenville	Unopposed	N/A	N/A

- From 1822 Temple was known by the courtesy title of Marquess of Chandos, as his father was created 1st Duke of Buckingham and Chandos

General election 1826: Buckinghamshire (2 seats)
Party	Candidate	Votes	%	±%
Tory	Richard Temple-Grenville	Unopposed	N/A	N/A
Whig	Robert Smith	Unopposed	N/A	N/A

General election 1830: Buckinghamshire (2 seats)
Party	Candidate	Votes	%
Tory	Richard Temple-Grenville	Unopposed	
Whig	Robert Smith	Unopposed	
Registered electors		c. 4,000	
Tory hold			
Whig hold			

General election 9 May 1831: Buckinghamshire (2 seats)
Party	Candidate	Votes	%
Tory	Richard Temple-Grenville	1,594	42.2
Whig	John Smith (Buckinghamshire MP)	1,284	34.0
Whig	Pascoe Grenfell	901	23.8
Turnout		2,593	c. 64.8
Registered electors		c. 4,000	
Majority		310	8.2
Tory hold			
Majority		383	10.2
Whig hold			

- Note (1831): Chandos 1,287 plumpers, 287 split with Smith, 18 split with Grenfell; Smith 191 plumpers, 806 split with Grenfell; Grenfell 2 plumpers. Total voters 2,593. (Source: Davis). Poll: 4 days.

General election 17 December 1832: Buckinghamshire (3 seats)
Party	Candidate	Votes	%	±%
Tory	Richard Temple-Grenville	2,856	33.8	+12.7
Whig	John Smith (Buckinghamshire MP)	2,402	28.5	−5.5
Whig	George Dashwood	1,647	19.5	−4.3
Tory	Charles Scott-Murray	1,536	18.2	−2.9
Turnout		4,189	78.9	+14.1
Registered electors		5,306		
Majority		454	5.3	−2.9
Tory hold		Swing	+8.8	
Majority		866	10.3	+0.1
Whig hold		Swing	−5.2	
Whig win (new seat)				

General election 10 January 1835: Buckinghamshire (3 seats)
Party	Candidate	Votes	%	±%
Conservative	Richard Temple-Grenville	3,094	28.9	+11.6
Conservative	William Young	2,394	22.4	+5.1
Conservative	James Backwell Praed	2,179	20.4	+3.1
Whig	George Dashwood	1,672	15.6	−12.9
Whig	John Lee	1,365	12.8	−6.7
Majority		507	4.8	−0.5
Turnout		3,946	73.5	−5.4
Registered electors		5,371		
Conservative hold		Swing	+9.1	
Conservative gain from Whig		Swing	+5.8	
Conservative gain from Whig		Swing	+4.8	

- Death of Praed

By-election, 20 February 1837: Buckinghamshire
Party	Candidate	Votes	%	±%
Conservative	George Simon Harcourt	2,233	69.5	−2.2
Whig	George Dashwood	982	30.5	+2.1
Majority		1,251	39.0	+34.2
Turnout		3,215	55.8	−17.7
Registered electors		5,760		
Conservative hold		Swing	−2.2	

General election 1837: Buckinghamshire (3 seats)
Party	Candidate	Votes	%	±%
Conservative	Richard Temple-Grenville	2,993	28.8	−0.1
Conservative	George Simon Harcourt	2,704	26.0	+3.6
Conservative	William Young	2,633	25.3	+4.9
Whig	George Robert Smith	2,071	19.9	−8.5
Majority		562	5.4	+0.6
Turnout		4,464	77.5	+4.0
Registered electors		5,760		
Conservative hold		Swing	+1.4	
Conservative hold		Swing	+3.2	
Conservative hold		Swing	+3.9	

- Succession of Chandos as 2nd Duke of Buckingham and Chandos

By-election, 18 February 1839: Buckinghamshire
Party	Candidate	Votes	%
Conservative	Caledon Du Pré	Unopposed	
Conservative hold			

=== Elections in the 1840-50s ===
General election 5 July 1841: Buckinghamshire (3 seats)
Party	Candidate	Votes	%	±%
Conservative	William Young	2,578	29.8	+4.5
Conservative	Caledon Du Pré	2,572	29.8	+1.0
Conservative	Charles Scott-Murray	2,547	29.5	+3.5
Whig	John Lee	495	5.7	−14.2
Radical	Henry Morgan Vane	450	5.2	N/A
Majority		2,052	23.7	+18.3
Turnout		3,071	49.9	−27.6
Registered electors		6,156		
Conservative hold		Swing	+4.6	
Conservative hold		Swing	+2.9	
Conservative hold		Swing	+4.2	

- Death of Young

By-election, 15 July 1842: Buckinghamshire
Party	Candidate	Votes	%	±%
Conservative	William Fitzmaurice	Unopposed		
Conservative hold				

- Resignation of Scott-Murray by accepting the office of Steward of the Manor of Hempholme

By-election, 21 February 1845: Buckinghamshire
Party	Candidate	Votes	%	±%
Conservative	Christopher Tower	Unopposed		
Conservative hold				

General election 4 August 1847: Buckinghamshire (3 seats)
Party	Candidate	Votes	%	±%
Whig	Charles Cavendish	Unopposed		
Conservative	Benjamin Disraeli	Unopposed		
Conservative	Caledon Du Pré	Unopposed		
Registered electors		5,798		
Whig gain from Conservative				
Conservative hold				
Conservative hold				

- Appointment of Disraeli as Chancellor of the Exchequer

By-election 12 March 1852: Buckinghamshire
Party	Candidate	Votes	%	±%
Conservative	Benjamin Disraeli	Unopposed		
Conservative hold				

General election 1852: Buckinghamshire (3 seats)
Party	Candidate	Votes	%	±%
Conservative	Caledon Du Pré	2,000	33.2	N/A
Conservative	Benjamin Disraeli	1,973	32.7	N/A
Whig	Charles Cavendish	1,403	23.3	N/A
Radical	John Lee	656	10.9	N/A
Majority		570	9.4	N/A
Turnout		3,016 (est)	53.3 (est)	N/A
Registered electors		5,659		
Conservative hold		Swing	N/A	
Conservative hold		Swing	N/A	
Whig hold		Swing	N/A	

General election 1857: Buckinghamshire (3 seats)
Party	Candidate	Votes	%	±%
Whig	Charles Cavendish	Unopposed		
Conservative	Benjamin Disraeli	Unopposed		
Conservative	Caledon Du Pré	Unopposed		
Registered electors		5,353		
Whig hold				
Conservative hold				
Conservative hold				

- Creation of Cavendish as 1st Baron Chesham

By-election 28 December 1857: Buckinghamshire
Party	Candidate	Votes	%	±%
Whig	William Cavendish	1,617	52.7	N/A
Conservative	Charles Baillie-Hamilton	1,454	47.3	N/A
Majority		163	5.4	N/A
Turnout		3,071	57.4	N/A
Registered electors		5,353		
Whig hold		Swing	N/A	

- Appointment of Disraeli as Chancellor of the Exchequer

By-election 8 March 1858: Buckinghamshire
Party	Candidate	Votes	%	±%
Conservative	Benjamin Disraeli	Unopposed		
Conservative hold				

General election 1859: Buckinghamshire (3 seats)
Party	Candidate	Votes	%	±%
Liberal	William Cavendish	Unopposed		
Conservative	Benjamin Disraeli	Unopposed		
Conservative	Caledon Du Pré	Unopposed		
Registered electors		5,343		
Liberal hold				
Conservative hold				
Conservative hold				

=== Elections in the 1860-80s ===
- Succession of Cavendish as 2nd Baron Chesham

By-election 29 December 1863: Buckinghamshire
Party	Candidate	Votes	%	±%
Conservative	Robert Harvey	2,311	88.1	N/A
Liberal	John Lee	313	11.9	N/A
Majority		1,998	76.2	N/A
Turnout		2,624	45.0	N/A
Registered electors		5,836		
Conservative gain from Liberal		Swing	N/A	

General election 1865: Buckinghamshire (3 seats)
Party	Candidate	Votes	%	±%
Conservative	Benjamin Disraeli	Unopposed		
Conservative	Caledon Du Pré	Unopposed		
Conservative	Robert Harvey	Unopposed		
Registered electors		6,126		
Conservative hold				
Conservative hold				
Conservative gain from Liberal				

- Appointment of Disraeli as Chancellor of the Exchequer

By-election 13 July 1866: Buckinghamshire
Party	Candidate	Votes	%	±%
Conservative	Benjamin Disraeli	Unopposed		
Conservative hold				

General election 19 November 1868: Buckinghamshire (3 seats)
Party	Candidate	Votes	%	±%
Conservative	Benjamin Disraeli	Unopposed		
Conservative	Caledon Du Pré	Unopposed		
Liberal	Nathaniel Lambert	Unopposed		
Registered electors		7,894		
Conservative hold				
Conservative hold				
Conservative hold				

General election 14 February 1874: Buckinghamshire (3 seats)
Party	Candidate	Votes	%	±%
Conservative	Benjamin Disraeli	2,999	38.6	N/A
Conservative	Robert Harvey	2,902	37.3	N/A
Liberal	Nathaniel Lambert	1,720	22.1	N/A
Ind. Conservative	William Talley	151	1.9	New
Turnout		4,822 (est)	65.4 (est)	N/A
Registered electors		7,368		
Conservative hold		Swing	N/A	
Conservative hold		Swing	N/A	
Majority		1,182	15.2	N/A
Liberal hold		Swing	N/A	
Majority		1,569	20.2	N/A

- Talley was a Slough solicitor who contested the seat as a "Progressive Conservative". (Source: Davis)
- Appointment of Disraeli as Prime Minister and First Lord of the Treasury

By-election 17 March 1874: Buckinghamshire
Party	Candidate	Votes	%	±%
Conservative	Benjamin Disraeli	Unopposed		
Conservative hold				

- Creation of Disraeli as 1st Earl of Beaconsfield

By-election 22 September 1876: Buckinghamshire
Party	Candidate	Votes	%	±%
Conservative	Thomas Fremantle	2,725	51.8	−24.1
Liberal	Rupert Carington	2,539	48.2	+26.1
Majority		186	3.5	−11.7
Turnout		5,264	72.4	+7.0
Registered electors		7,273		
Conservative hold		Swing	−25.1	

General election 10 April 1880: Buckinghamshire (3 seats)
Party	Candidate	Votes	%	±%
Conservative	Robert Harvey	2,956	31.7	−5.6
Conservative	Thomas Fremantle	2,790	29.9	−8.7
Liberal	Rupert Carington	2,790	29.9	+7.8
Ind. Conservative	Frederick Charsley	796	8.5	N/A
Turnout		5,746 (est)	70.8 (est)	+5.4
Registered electors		8,114		
Conservative hold		Swing	−4.8	
Conservative hold		Swing	−6.3	
Majority		0	0.0	−15.2
Liberal hold		Swing	+11.1	
Majority		1,994	21.4	+1.2

- Constituency divided in the 1885 redistribution

== See also ==
- List of former United Kingdom Parliament constituencies
- Unreformed House of Commons
- List of parliaments of England

Parliament of the United Kingdom
Vacant since 1865 Title last held by Tiverton	Constituency represented by the prime minister 27 February – 1 December 1868	Succeeded by Greenwich
Preceded by Greenwich	Constituency represented by the prime minister 1874–1876	Vacant until 1880 Title next held by Midlothian
