= Alexander Denton (judge) =

British lawyer and politician

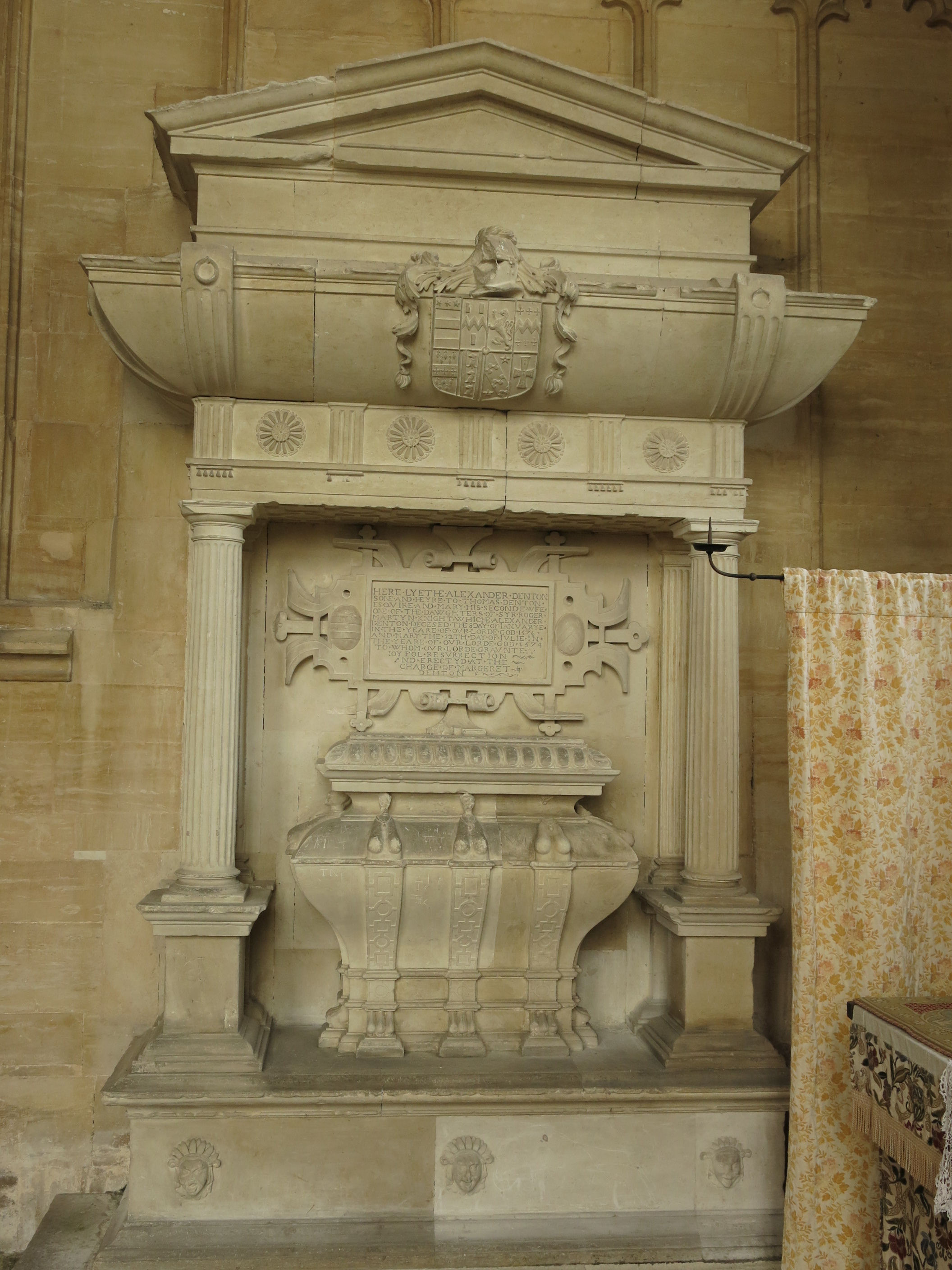
- Denton monument in the Church of All Saints, Hillesden

Justice of the Common Pleas
- In office 1722-1740

Member of Parliament for Buckingham
- In office 1708-1709; 1715-1722

Irish House of Commons for Carrickfergus
- In office 1709-1713

Personal details
- Born: 14 August 1679
- Died: 22 March 1740 (aged 60)
- Spouse: Catherine Bond
- Relatives: George Chamberlayne (nephew); Edmund Denton (brother)
- Education: St Edmund Hall, Oxford

Alexander Denton (14 August 1679 – 22 March 1740) was a British lawyer and politician who sat in the House of Commons between 1708 and 1722 and in the Irish House of Commons from 1709 to 1715.

== Biography ==
Denton was the second son of Alexander Denton and his wife Hester Herman, daughter of Nicholas Herman of Middleton Stoney, Oxfordshire. He was educated at Buckingham in 1694 and matriculated at St Edmund Hall, Oxford in 1697. He was admitted at Middle Temple in 1698 and called to the bar in 1704. His father, Alexander Denton, was also a Member of Parliament (MP) representing Buckingham, from 1690 to 1698. He was the younger brother of Sir Edmund Denton.

Denton was returned as Member of Parliament (MP) for Buckingham at the 1708 general election. He also sat in the Irish House of Commons for Carrickfergus from 1709 to 1713. At the 1715 general election he was returned as MP for Buckingham again. He became a Bencher of Middle Temple in 1720 and in 1722 after being returned as MP again he gave up his seat in Parliament on being appointed Justice of the Common Pleas and remained as such until his death.

Denton made a financially advantageous marriage on 3 March 1716 to Catherine Bond, daughter of John Bond of Sundridge, Kent. She died in 1733 and he died on 22 March 1740. He was childless, as was his brother, and so his property descended to his nephew George Chamberlayne.

He is buried with his wife in Hillesden Church with a large monument by Henry Cheere commissioned on the death of his wife.

Parliament of Great Britain
Preceded by Edmund Denton; Browne Willis	Member of Parliament for Buckingham; 1708–1710; With: Sir Richard Temple, 4th Bt.	Succeeded by Sir Richard Temple, 4th Bt. Thomas Chapman
Preceded by John Radcliffe; Thomas Chapman	Member of Parliament for Buckingham; 1715–1722; With: Abraham Stanyan 1715-1718; Edmund Halsey 1718-1722; Richard Grenville1722	Succeeded by William Heathcote; Richard Grenville
