= John Egerton, 3rd Earl of Bridgewater =

English politician (1646–1701)

The Right Honourable The Earl of Bridgewater KB PC
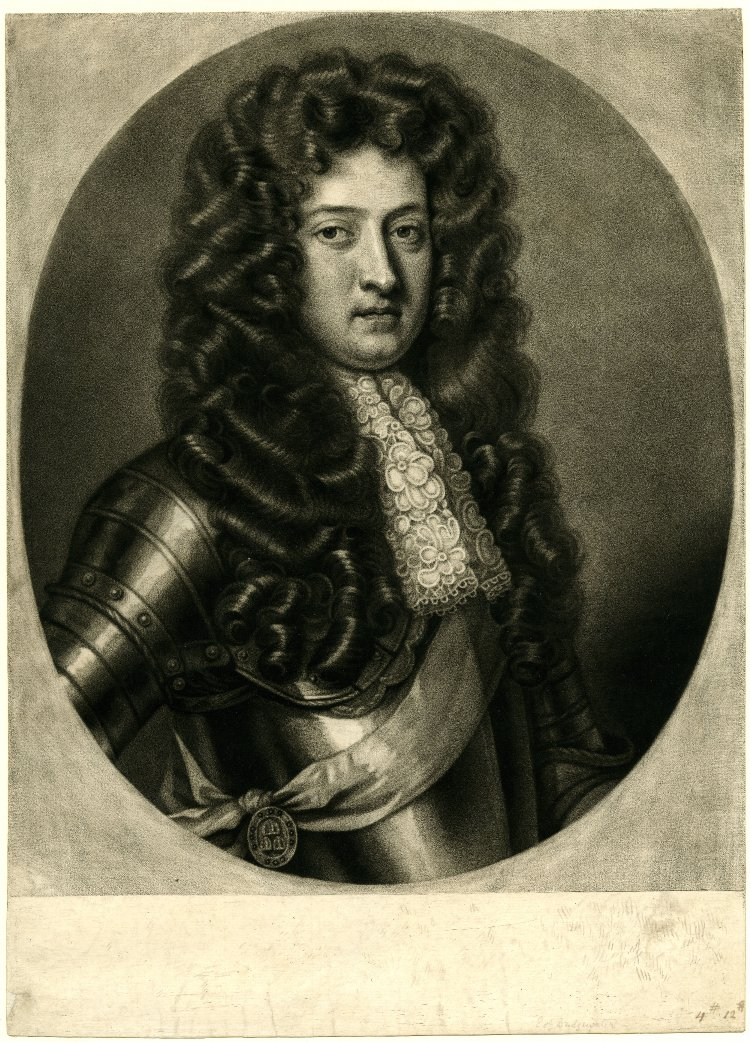

First Lord of the Admiralty
- In office 1699–1701
- Preceded by: The Earl of Orford
- Succeeded by: The Earl of Pembroke

First Lord of Trade
- In office 16 December 1695 – 9 June 1699
- Preceded by: Vacant; Last held by The Earl of Shaftesbury
- Succeeded by: The Earl of Stamford

Member of Parliament for Buckinghamshire With Thomas Warton
- In office 1685–1686
- Preceded by: Richard Hampden
- Succeeded by: Thomas Lee
- Born: 9 November 1646
- Died: 19 March 1701 (aged 54)
- Spouse(s): Lady Elizabeth Cranfield (m. 1664; died 1668) Lady Jane Paulet (m. 1673)
- Children: 10
- Parents: John Egerton, 2nd Earl of Bridgewater (father); Lady Elizabeth Cavendish (mother)

John Egerton, 3rd Earl of Bridgewater, KB, PC (9 November 1646 – 19 March 1701) was an English politician.

He was the eldest son of John Egerton, 2nd Earl of Bridgewater and his wife Elizabeth Cavendish. His maternal grandparents were William Cavendish, 1st Duke of Newcastle and his first wife Elizabeth Basset.

On 17 November 1664, he married Lady Elizabeth Cranfield, daughter of James Cranfield, 2nd Earl of Middlesex. She gave birth to a son, but died in childbirth. He married his second wife on 2 April 1673, Lady Jane Paulet, eldest daughter of Charles Paulet, 1st Duke of Bolton.

In 1673 and until as late as 1685, Brackley was colonel of the Buckinghamshire Militia Horse and Foot, commissioned by his father who was the Lord Lieutenant of Buckinghamshire. The Egertons used the militia to harass Quakers and Baptists in the county.

Egerton served as a Member of Parliament for Buckinghamshire as a Whig from 1685 until his father's death in 1686, when he became a member of the House of Lords upon succeeding to the earldom. He also served as Lord Lieutenant of Buckinghamshire following his father's death, but was dismissed after his first period in office by King James II for refusing to produce a list of Catholics to serve as officers in the English Militia. He was later reinstated to the position when William III came to the throne and James II was forced into exile.

He served as First Lord of Trade in the Convention Parliament, 1690–1691. He was promoted to the cabinet as First Lord of the Admiralty by the Whigs in 1699. He served in this position until March 1700/1.

He was chosen as a Speaker for the House of Lords in 1697 and then again for 1701.

== Family ==
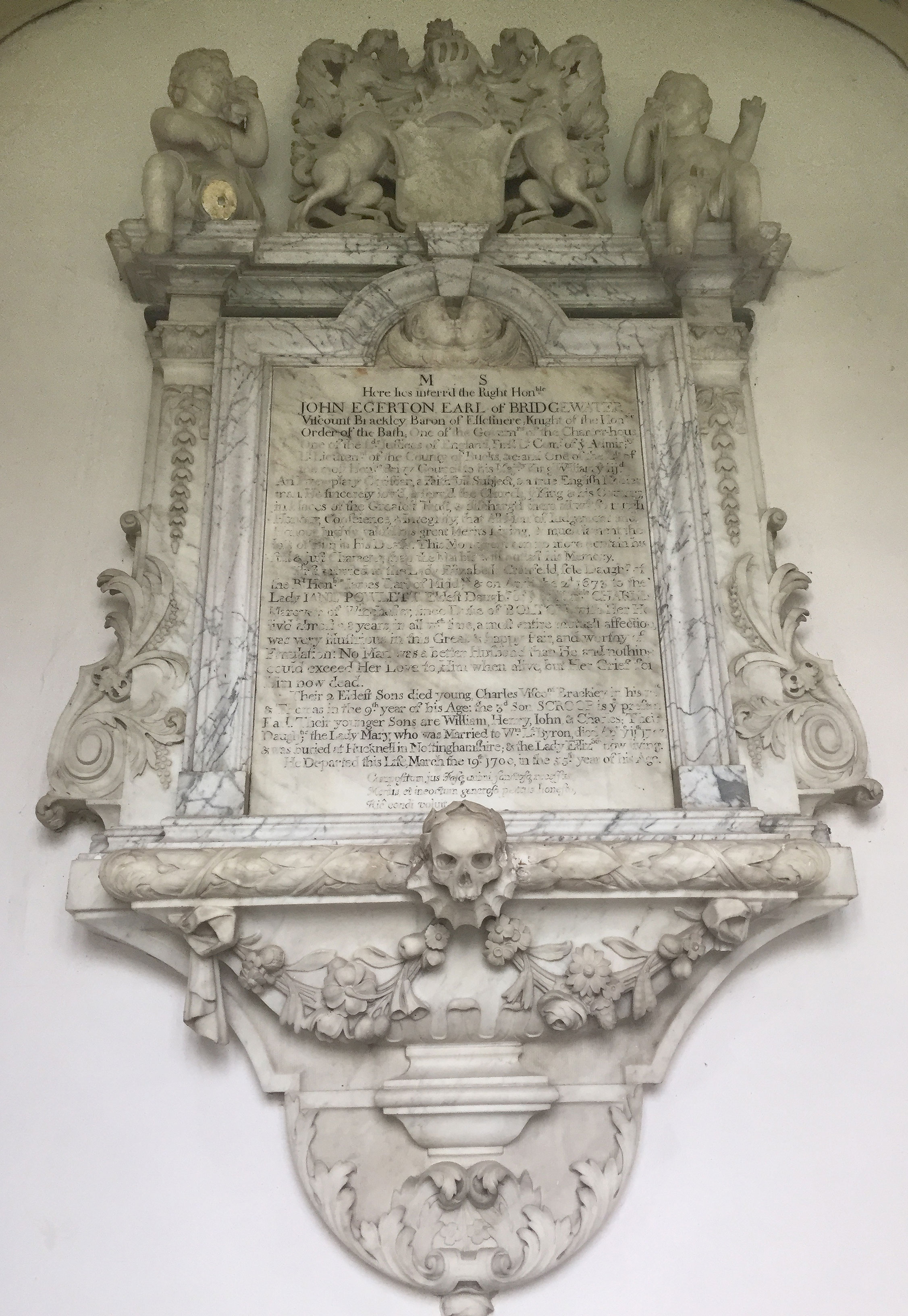
Memorial to the 3rd Earl of Bridgewater and his family in the Bridgewater Chapel, Little Gaddesden Church

He was first married to Elizabeth Cranfield, a daughter of James Cranfield, 2nd Earl of Middlesex and Anne Bourchier. They had only one known child who survived birth:

- John Cranfield (11 January 1668 – 31 March 1670).

On 2 April 1673, Bridgewater married his second wife Jane Paulet. She was a daughter of Charles Paulet, 1st Duke of Bolton and his second wife Mary Scrope. Mary was the eldest illegitimate daughter of Emanuel Scrope, 1st Earl of Sunderland, and his mistress Martha Jones; she became her father's co-heiress when a brother died childless. They had nine children:

- Charles Egerton, Viscount Brackley (7 May 1675 – April 1687) died at age 11 at Bridgwater House, the Barbican, London, England, burnt to death in the fire which destroyed Bridgwater House. He was buried on 14 April 1687 at Little Gaddesden, Hertfordshire, England.
- Lady Mary Egerton (14 May 1676 – 11 April 1704). Married William Byron, 4th Baron Byron
- Hon. Thomas Egerton (15 August 1679 – April 1687) died at age 7 at Bridgwater House, the Barbican, London, England, burnt to death in the fire which destroyed Bridgwater House. He was buried on 14 April 1687 at Little Gaddesden, Hertfordshire, England.
- Scroop Egerton, 1st Duke of Bridgewater (11 August 1681 – 11 January 1744/5)
- Hon. William Egerton (1684-15 July 1732), MP and soldier
- Hon. Henry Egerton, Bishop of Hereford (10 February 1689 – 1 April 1746). Married Elizabeth Ariana Bentinck, a daughter of William Bentinck, 1st Earl of Portland and his second wife Jane Martha Temple. They were parents to John Egerton, Bishop of Durham.
- Hon. John Egerton (d. c.1707), a Page of Honour
- Hon. Charles Egerton (d. 7 November 1725). Married Catherine Greville. His wife was a sister of William Greville, 7th Baron Brooke.
- Lady Elizabeth Egerton. Married Thomas Catesby Paget. Her husband was a son of Henry Paget, 1st Earl of Uxbridge and his wife Mary Catesby. They were parents of Henry Paget, 2nd Earl of Uxbridge.

Political offices
| New title Establishment of the Board of Trade | First Lord of Trade; 1695–1699 | Succeeded by The Earl of Stamford |
| Preceded by The Earl of Orford | First Lord of the Admiralty; 1699–1701 | Succeeded by The Earl of Pembroke and Montgomery as Lord High Admiral |
Parliament of England
| Preceded by Thomas Wharton; Richard Hampden | Member of Parliament for Buckinghamshire; 1685–1686; With: Thomas Wharton | Succeeded by Hon. Thomas Wharton; Sir Thomas Lee, Bt |
Honorary titles
| Preceded by The Earl of Bridgewater | Lord Lieutenant of Buckinghamshire; 1686–1687 | Succeeded by The Lord Jeffreys |
| Preceded by The Lord Jeffreys | Lord Lieutenant of Buckinghamshire; 1689–1701 | Succeeded by The Lord Wharton |
Peerage of England
| Preceded by John Egerton | Earl of Bridgewater; 2nd creation 1686–1701 | Succeeded by Scroop Egerton |
