= William Egerton (politician, died 1732) =

British Army officer and Whig politician

The Honourable William Egerton MP
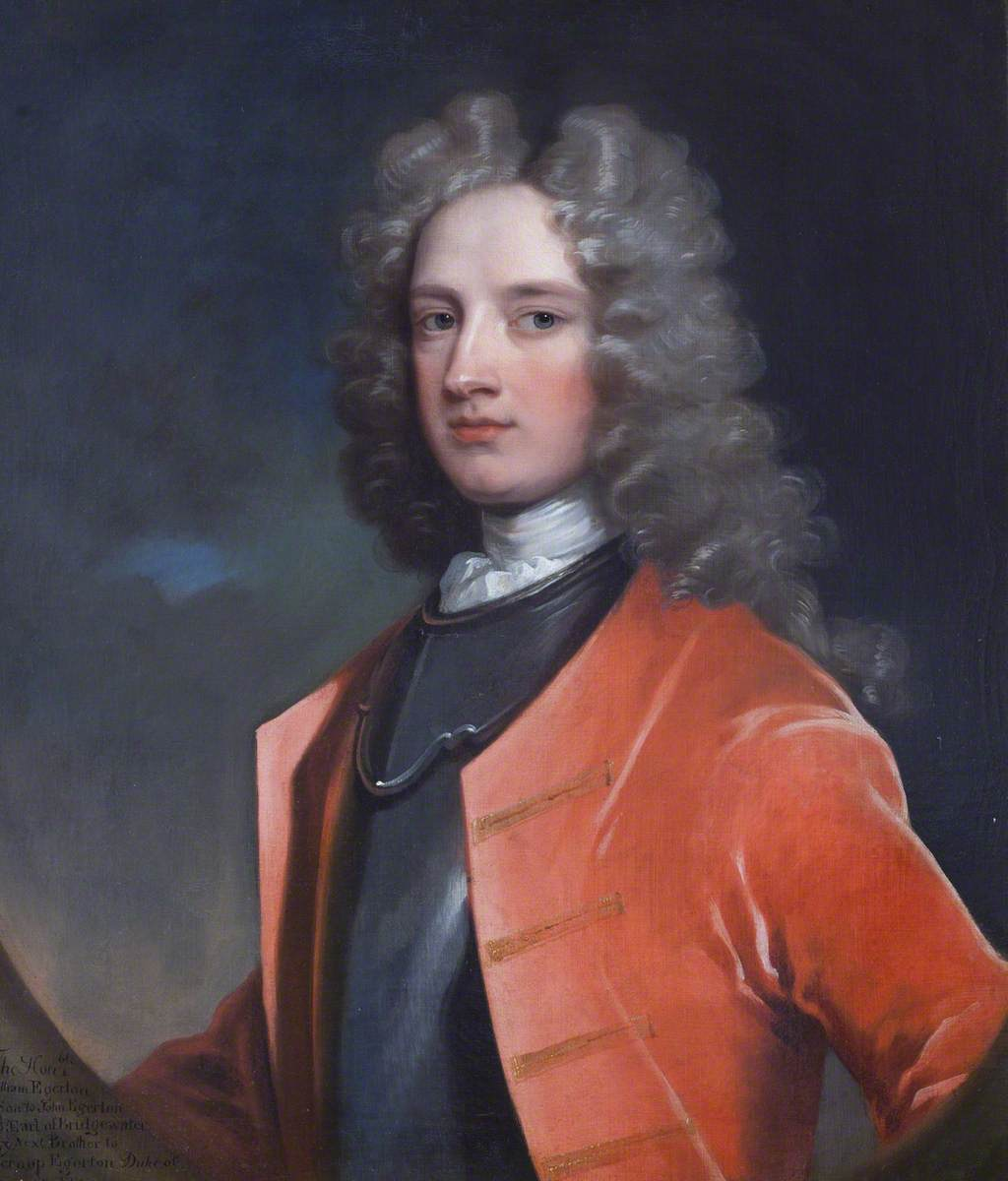
- Egerton, by Charles Jervas

Member of Parliament for Brackley
- In office 1708–1714

Member of Parliament for Brackley
- In office 1715–1732

Military service
- Allegiance: Kingdom of Great Britain
- Branch/service: British Army
- Rank: Colonel
- Unit: 6th Regiment of Foot; 1st Foot Guards

Arms of Egerton: Argent, a lion rampant gules between three pheons sable

William Egerton (1684–1732) was a British Army officer and Whig politician who sat in the House of Commons almost continuously from 1706 to 1732.

== Early life ==
Egerton was the fourth son of John Egerton, 3rd Earl of Bridgwater and his wife Jane Paulet, daughter of Charles Paulet, 1st Duke of Bolton. He travelled abroad in Germany and then joined the army. He was a captain in the 6th Foot in 1704 and was captain and lieutenant in the 1st Foot Guards from 1705.

== Career ==
Egerton was returned unopposed as Member of Parliament (MP) for Buckinghamshire at a by-election on 27 February 1706. At the 1708 British general election, he was returned unopposed as Whig MP for Brackley. He was initially inactive in the House as he was serving with the army in Flanders, but voted for the impeachment of Dr Sacheverell in 1710. He was returned again at the 1710 British general election and voted for the motion of ‘No Peace Without Spain’ and against the French commerce bill on 18 June 1713. At the 1713 British general election he was returned in a contest and on voted against the expulsion of Richard Steele on 18 March 1714. Egerton was said to have spoken insultingly about the Duke of Ormond, and in April 1714 he was told by Secretary at War, Francis Gwyn, that the Queen ‘had no further service for him’ and was to be given 1,000 guineas for his company. He was then unseated on petition on 20 April 1714.

After the Hanoverian succession Egerton was made Colonel of his own infantry regiment, later known as the 36th Regiment of Foot. He was returned unopposed as MP for Brackley at the 1715 general election. In 1719 he was made Colonel of another Regiment, later known as the 20th Regiment of Foot. He was returned unopposed again for Brackley in 1722 and 1727. He voted with the government on all known occasions.

== Death and legacy ==
Egerton died on 15 July 1732. He had married Anna Maria Saunders, the daughter of Admiral Sir George Saunders, Commissioner of the Navy, and had three daughters. His daughter Jane married Thomas Revell MP of Fetcham Park.

Parliament of England
Preceded by Robert Dormer; Sir Richard Temple, 4th Bt.	Member of Parliament for Buckinghamshire; 1706–1708; With: Sir Richard Temple, 4th Bt.	Succeeded by Sir Edmund Denton, 1st Bt. Richard Hampden
Parliament of Great Britain
Preceded by Harry Mordaunt; Charles Egerton	Member of Parliament for Brackley; 1708–1714; With: Charles Egerton; John Burgh; Paul Methuen	Succeeded by John Burgh; Henry Watkins
Preceded by John Burgh; Henry Watkins	Member of Parliament for Brackley; 1715– 1732; With: Sir Paul Methuen	Succeeded by Dr George Lee; Sir Paul Methuen
Military offices
Preceded by Henry Disney	Colonel of William Egerton's; Regiment of Foot; 1715–1719	Succeeded by Sir Charles Hotham, 4th Baronet
Preceded by Thomas Meredyth	Colonel of William Egerton's; Regiment of Foot; 1719–1732	Succeeded by Francis Howard, 1st Earl of Effingham
