= Richard Lowndes (MP) =

English politician

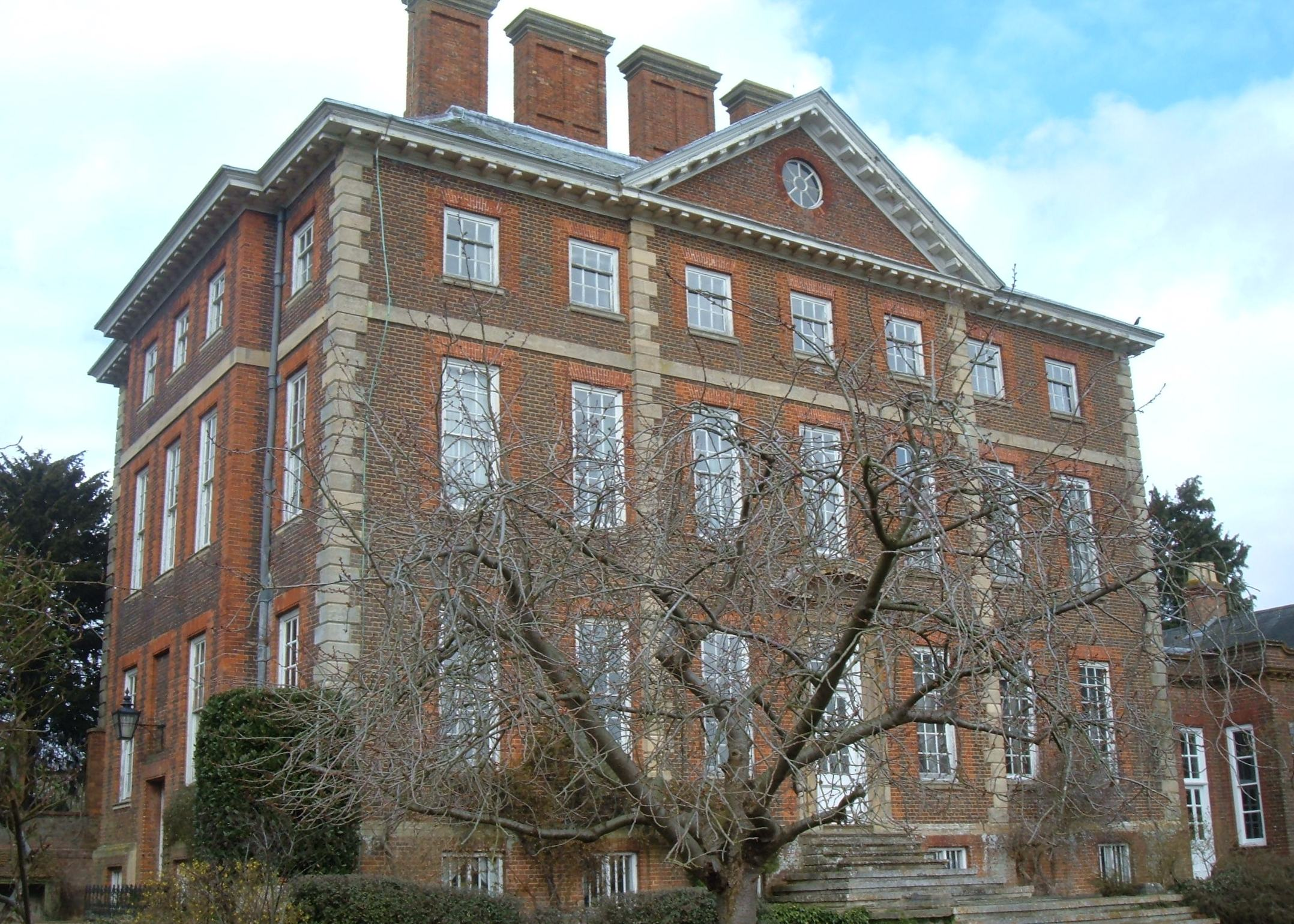
Winslow Hall

Richard Lowndes (?1707–75), of Winslow, Buckinghamshire, was an English politician.

He was the son of Robert Lowndes of Winslow, Buckinghamshire and educated at Eton School and Worcester College, Oxford. He succeeded his father in 1727, inheriting considerable estates, including Winslow Hall. He later passed Winslow Hall to his son on the latter's marriage in 1766.

He was appointed High Sheriff of Buckinghamshire for 1738–39 and was elected MP for Buckinghamshire (1741–1774).

He married Essex, the daughter and coheiress of Charles Shales, banker, of London, in St Paul's Cathedral in 1730. They had 1 son (William, who later changed his name to William Shelby to inherit Whaddon Hall) and 2 daughters.

Parliament of Great Britain
Preceded by Sir Thomas Lee, Bt; Sir William Stanhope	Member of Parliament for Buckinghamshire; 1741–1774; With: Richard Grenville-Temple 1741–47; Sir William Stanhope 1747–68; The Earl Verney from 1768	Succeeded by The Earl Verney; George Grenville
