= Elizabeth Egerton, Countess of Bridgewater (1626–1663) =

English writer who married into the Egerton family

The Right Honourable The Countess of Bridgewater
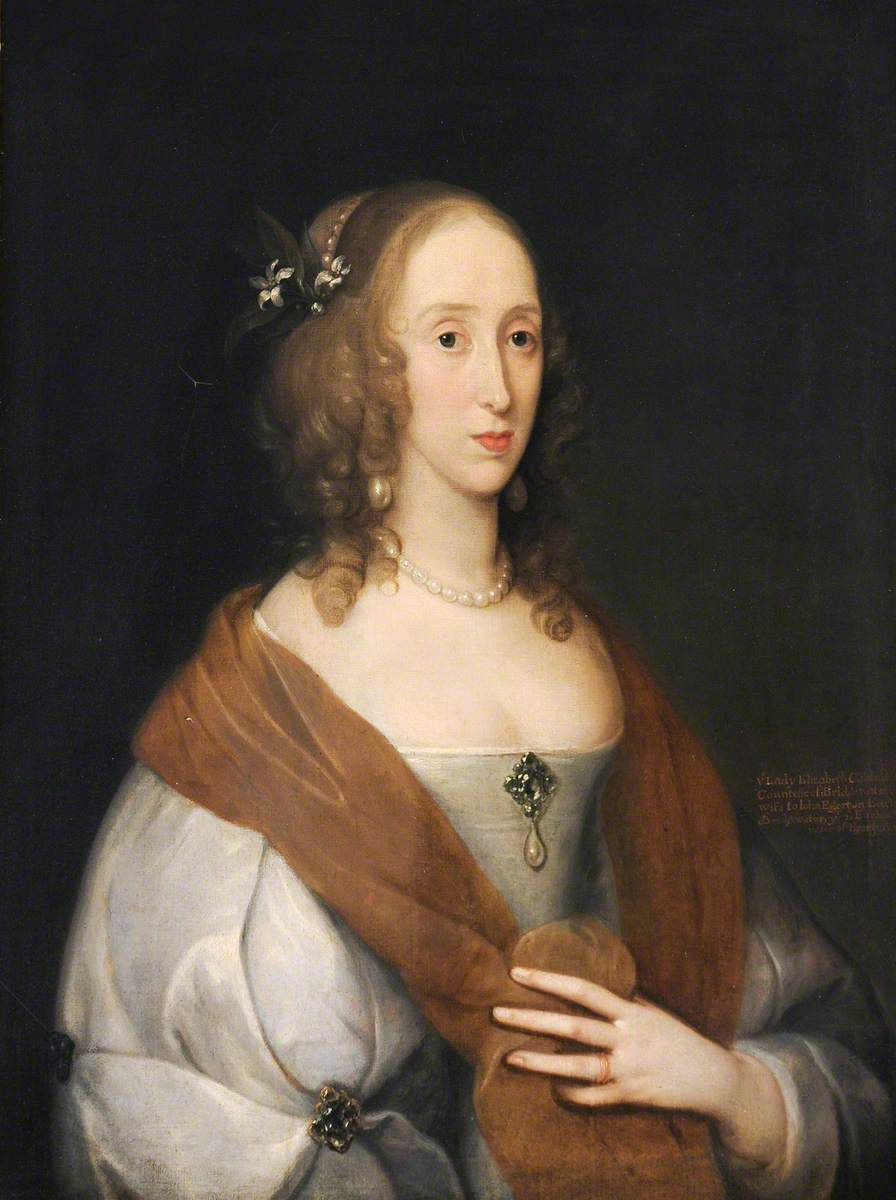

Countess of Bridgewater
- Born: 1626
- Died: 14 July 1663 (aged 36–37)
- Buried: Ashridge, Hertfordshire
- Noble family: Cavendish
- Spouse: John Egerton, 2nd Earl of Bridgewater
- Issue: John Egerton, 3rd Earl of Bridgewater; Sir William Egerton KB; Thomas Egerton; Charles Egerton MP; Elizabeth Egerton
- Father: William Cavendish, 1st Duke of Newcastle
- Mother: Elizabeth Basset Howard,

Elizabeth Egerton, Countess of Bridgewater (née Lady Elizabeth Cavendish; 1626 – 14 July 1663) was an English writer who married into the Egerton family.

== Biography ==
Elizabeth Cavendish was encouraged in her literary interests from a young age by her father, William Cavendish, 1st Duke of Newcastle, himself an author and patron of the arts surrounded by a literary coterie which included Ben Jonson, Thomas Shadwell, and John Dryden. Her works consist of a series of manuscripts, some of which have recently become available in modern editions.

She married John Egerton (Lord Brackley) in 1641, when she was fifteen. Her mother, Elizabeth Bassett, died in 1643, and her father was later remarried to noted writer Margaret Cavendish. William Cavendish and his sons relocated to France during the English Civil War, while Egerton and her sisters Jane and Frances remained at the besieged family seat in Nottinghamshire until 1645 when she relocated to her husband's home where she was relatively sheltered from the rest of the war. Egerton's earliest manuscript compilation (Bodl. Oxf., MS Rawl. poet. 16; Yale University, Beinecke Library, Osborn MS b. 233), an anthology of poems and dramas, Poems Songs a Pastorall and a Play by the Right Honorable the Lady Jane Cavendish and Lady Elizabeth Brackley, co-written with her sister, dates from this period. The Concealed Fansyes, the play mentioned in that title, "features two heroines who hold out for and get 'equall marryage,' having trained the gallants, Courtley and Praesumption, who were intending to train them." Egerton's final manuscript collection, known as the "Loose Papers," is made up of prayers, meditations, and essays, some written in response to the illness and death of her children — only four of whom survived to adulthood — and some to pregnancy and childbirth:

O Lord, I knowe thou mightest have smothered this my Babe in the wombe, but thou art ever mercyfull, and hast at this time brought us both from greate dangers, and me from the greate torture of childbirth.

Elizabeth Egerton died delivering her tenth child and was buried at Ashridge, Hertfordshire. Her manuscripts are held at the Nottingham University Library, Portland collection (letters); the Bodleian and Beinecke libraries (Poems Songs &c.); and the British and Huntington Libraries (her "Loose Papers"). Her essays on marriage and widowhood "open a highly unusual window on the thinking of a seventeenth-century woman."

== Selected works ==
- Cheyne, Jane, Lady, 1621–1669 and Egerton, Elizabeth Cavendish, 1626–1663. The Concealed Fansyes: A Play by Lady Jane Cavendish and Lady Elizabeth Brackley. Edited by Nathan Comfort Starr. PMLA, Vol. 46, No. 3 (Sep., 1931), pp. 802–838. Copyright not renewed.
- With Jane Cavendish. From "A Pastorall"; "An answeare to my Lady Alice Edgertons Songe"; "On my Boy Henry"; and "On the death of my Deare Sister." Rprt. Kissing the Rod: an anthology of seventeenth-century women's verse. Germaine Greer et al., eds. Farrar Staus Giroux, 1988. 106-118.
