= Richard Temple, 1st Viscount Cobham =

British Army officer and politician (1675–1749)

Field Marshal The Right Honourable The Viscount Cobham PC
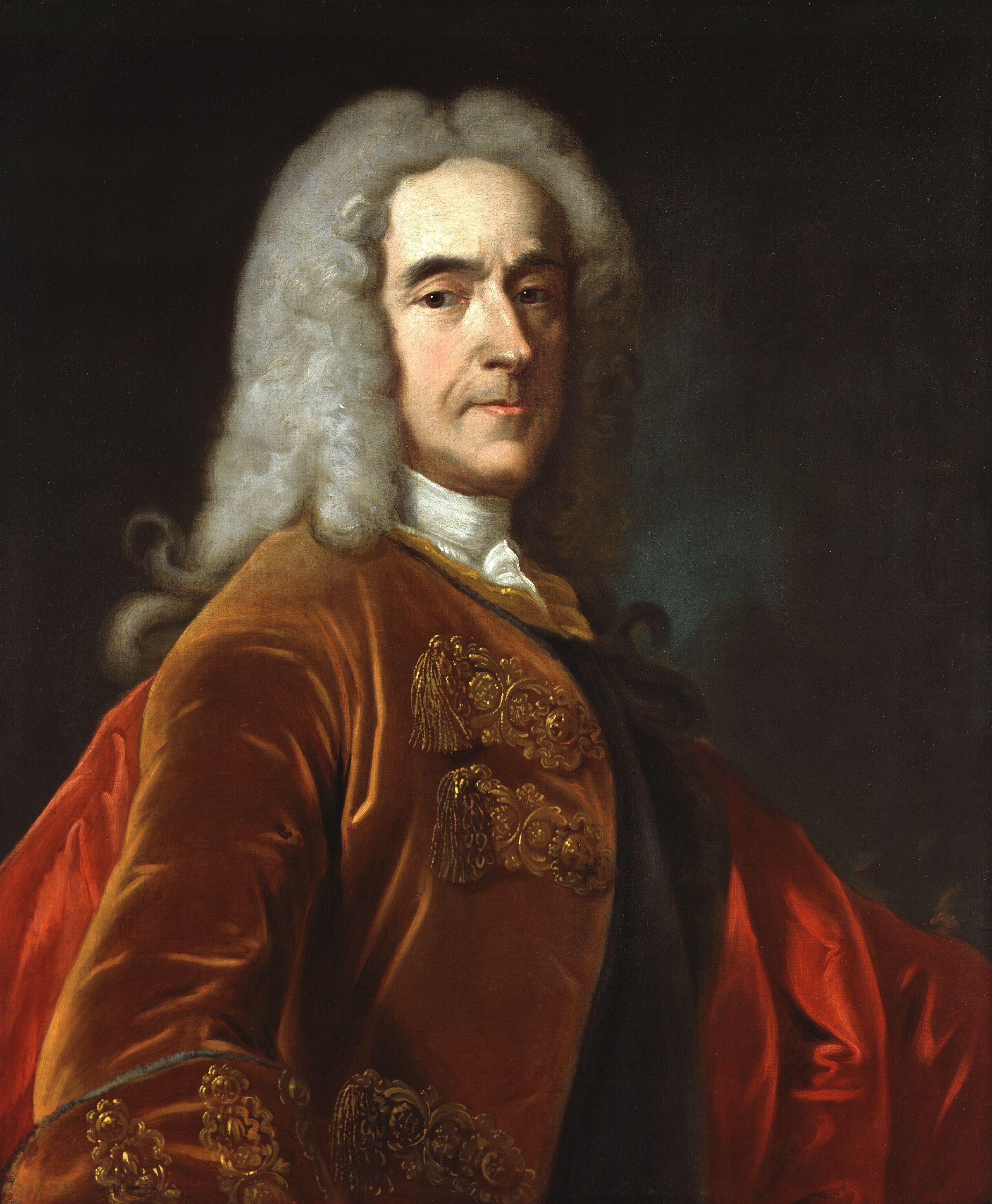
- Portrait by Jean-Baptiste van Loo, c. 1740
- Born: 24 October 1675; Parchim, Mecklenburg-Schwerin
- Died: 14 September 1749 (aged 73); Stowe House, Buckinghamshire
- Burial place: Stowe, Buckinghamshire
- Military career
- Allegiance: England; Great Britain
- Branch: English Army; British Army
- Service years: 1685–1749
- Rank: Field Marshal
- Conflicts: Williamite War in Ireland; Nine Years' War; War of the Spanish Succession; War of the Quadruple Alliance

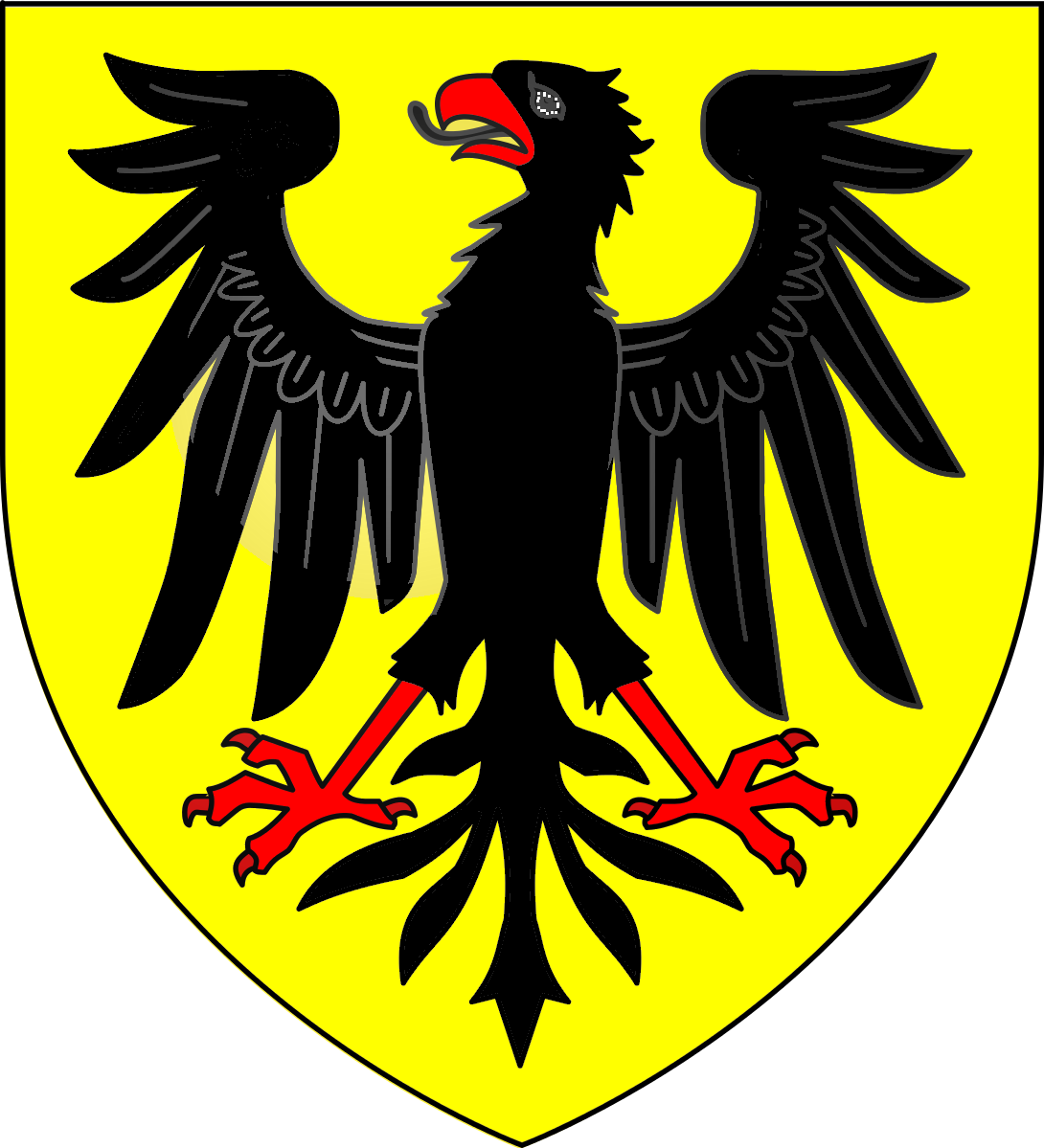
Arms of Temple of Stowe: Or, an eagle displayed sable

Field Marshal Richard Temple, 1st Viscount Cobham, PC (24 October 1675 – 14 September 1749) was a British army officer and Whig politician. After serving as a junior officer under William III during the Williamite War in Ireland and Nine Years' War, Temple fought under John Churchill, 1st Duke of Marlborough during the War of the Spanish Succession. During the War of the Quadruple Alliance he led a force of 4,000 troops on a raid on the Spanish coastline which captured Vigo and Pontevedra for ten days. In Parliament Temple generally supported the Whigs but fell out with Sir Robert Walpole in 1733. He was known for his ownership of and modifications to the estate at Stowe House and for serving as a political mentor to the young William Pitt.

== Military career ==
Born on 24 October 1675, Temple was the son of Sir Richard Temple, 3rd Baronet, and his wife Mary Temple (née Knapp, daughter of Thomas Knapp), Temple was educated at Eton College and Christ's College, Cambridge, and was commissioned as an ensign in Prince George of Denmark's Regiment on 30 June 1685. After becoming a captain in Babington's Regiment in 1689, he fought under William III during the Williamite War in Ireland against the Jacobite Irish Army of James II. He was present at the Siege of Namur in July 1695 during the Nine Years' War.

Temple succeeded his father as 4th Baronet in May 1697 and as Whig member of parliament for Buckingham later that year: he continued to represent either Buckingham or Buckinghamshire for the next 16 years. Promoted to lieutenant colonel on 10 February 1702, he was given his own regiment to command. He fought under John Churchill, 1st Duke of Marlborough at the Battle of Venlo in September 1702 and at the Battle of Roermond in October 1702 during the War of the Spanish Succession. He also took part in the Battle of Oudenarde in July 1708 and the Siege of Lille in Autumn 1708.

For his good conduct at Lille he was sent home to present the despatches to Queen Anne. In Parliament he supported the Whigs and voted for the Foreign Protestants Naturalization Act 1708 which allowed Protestants fleeing from the continent to enter Great Britain. Promoted to major-general on 1 January 1709, he fought again at the Battle of Malplaquet in September 1709 and was promoted to lieutenant general on 1 January 1710. In Parliament, in accordance with Whig party policy, he voted for the impeachment of Henry Sacheverell, a clergyman who had criticised the party, in March 1710.

In recognition of his service in the field, Temple was appointed colonel of the Princess Anne of Denmark's Regiment of Dragoons in April 1710. From 1711, he made dramatic changes to his family estate at Stowe; the work was carried out under the guidance of John Vanbrugh, a skilled architect, and the future royal gardener, Charles Bridgeman.

In 1713, the Harley Ministry stripped Temple of his colonelcy for voting against the Treaty of Utrecht. However, after George I ascended the throne following the Hanoverian Succession, Temple became ambassador to Vienna and was created Baron Cobham in October 1714. He became colonel of The Royal Regiment of Dragoons in 1715 and Constable of Windsor Castle in 1716. He was made a Privy Councillor in July 1716 and created Viscount Cobham in April 1718.

Temple was a mentor and Patron to a number of young Whigs, the most notable being William Pitt. Collectively they became known as Cobham's Cubs. Two of them, Pitt and Temple's nephew George Grenville went on to be prime minister. In September 1719, during the War of the Quadruple Alliance, Temple led a force of 4,000 troops on a raid on the Spanish coastline which captured Vigo and occupied it for ten days before withdrawing.

Temple generally supported the government of Sir Robert Walpole once it came to power in April 1721 and was rewarded with the colonelcy of the King's Own Regiment of Horse later that year. He became Governor of Jersey in May 1723 and Lord Lieutenant of Buckinghamshire in March 1728.

== Later life ==
Temple fell out with Prime Minister Robert Walpole in 1733 and formed a faction in the Whig Party to oppose the Excise Bill which resulted in his being stripped of his colonelcy again. He was promoted to full general on 27 October 1735.

Temple provided patronage to the rising star of the Whig Party, William Pitt, securing him a cornet's commission in his regiment. The group of Temple's young supporters were known as Cobham's Cubs and included Richard Grenville, George Grenville and George Lyttelton, as well as Pitt. After Walpole's fall as prime minister in 1742, they turned their attacks on his replacement – a government led by Lord Wilmington and Lord Carteret.

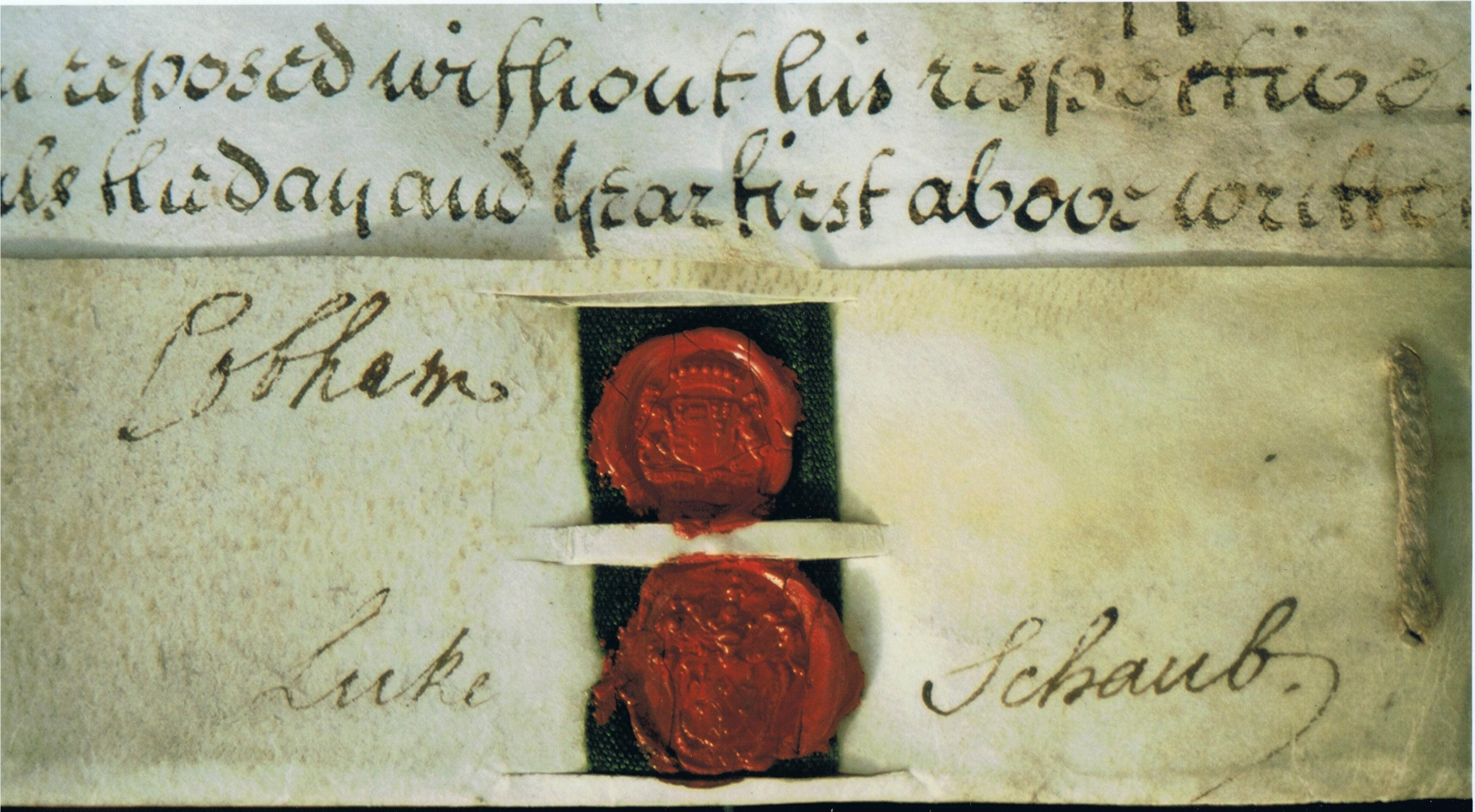
Temple's signature and seal on a marriage settlement of 1734

Promoted to field marshal on 10 July 1742, Temple became colonel of the 1st Troop of Horse Grenadier Guards that same day, colonel of Viscount Cobham's Regiment of Horse in 1744 and colonel of Viscount Cobham's Regiment of Dragoons in June 1745. He died at Stowe on 13 September 1749 and was buried there.

== Family ==
In September 1715 Temple married Anne Halsey, daughter of Edmund Halsey who had owned the Anchor Brewery: her inheritance allowed Temple to maintain the Stowe estate; they had no surviving children. (Their daughter, Elizabeth, was born on 1 September 1738, and baptised at St James' Church, Westminster, on 28 September. She died shortly before her 4th birthday and was buried on the family estate on 16 July 1742). Cobham came to an agreement with his heirs, distant cousins on whom the estate would have been entailed, on order to favour the family of his sister Hester Grenville. Hester's eldest son would take the name Grenville-Temple and eventually inherit the title 2nd Viscount Cobham and the estates of Wotton and Stowe.

== Legacy ==
Temple was admired by Alexander Pope, and Temple's gardens were praised by Pope in his Epistle to Burlington as a wonder. Pope wrote a "moral epistle" to Temple in 1733 and published it in the same year as An Epistle to the Right Honourable Richard Lord Visct. Cobham. Pope praises Temple as a practical man of the world whose "ruling passion" was service to his country, whatever the cost. Basil Williams said Temple "had all the coarse, roystering bluffness of the hardened old campaigners of that time".

== Sources ==
- Heathcote, Tony (1999). The British Field Marshals 1736–1997. Pen & Sword Books Ltd. ISBN 0-85052-696-5.
- Hoppit, Julian (2000). A Land of Liberty? England 1689–1727. Oxford: Clarendon Press. ISBN 978-0198228424.
- Rodger, N. A. M. (2006). Command of the Ocean: A Naval History of Britain, 1649–1815. Penguin Books.
- Williams, Basil (1914). The Life of William Pitt, Earl of Chatham. London: Longmans, Green, and Co.

Parliament of England
Preceded by Sir Richard Temple, Bt; Alexander Denton	Member of Parliament for Buckingham; 1697–1702; With: Alexander Denton 1697–1698; Sir Edmund Denton, Bt 1698–1702	Succeeded by Sir Edmund Denton, Bt; Roger Price
Preceded by The Viscount Newhaven; Goodwin Egerton	Member of Parliament for Buckinghamshire; 1704–1707; With: The Viscount Newhaven 1704–1705; Robert Dormer 1705–1706; William Egerton 1706–1707	Succeeded by Parliament of Great Britain
Preceded by Sir Edmund Denton, Bt; Roger Price	Member of Parliament for Buckingham; May – December 1705; With: Sir Edmund Denton, Bt	Succeeded by Sir Edmund Denton, Bt; Browne Willis
Parliament of Great Britain
Preceded by Parliament of England	Member of Parliament for Buckinghamshire; 1707–1708; With: William Egerton	Succeeded by Sir Edmund Denton, Bt; Richard Hampden
Preceded by Sir Edmund Denton, Bt; Browne Willis	Member of Parliament for Buckingham; 1708–1713; With: Alexander Denton 1708–1710; Thomas Chapman 1710–1713	Succeeded by Thomas Chapman; John Radcliffe
Military offices
Preceded by The Earl of Essex	Colonel of the Princess Anne of Denmark's Regiment of Dragoons; 1710–1713	Succeeded by William Evans
Preceded by The Earl of Strafford	Colonel of The Royal Regiment of Dragoons; 1715–1721	Succeeded by Sir Charles Hotham, Bt
Preceded by The Viscount of Irvine	Colonel of The King's Own Regiment of Horse; 1721–1733	Succeeded by The Earl of Pembroke
Preceded by James Dormer	Captain and Colonel of the 1st Troop of Horse Grenadier Guards; 1742–1745	Succeeded by Richard Onslow
Preceded by Clement Neville	Colonel of Viscount Cobham's Regiment of Horse; 1744–1745	Succeeded by Thomas Wentworth
Preceded by Charles Churchill	Colonel of Viscount Cobham's Regiment of Dragoons; 1745–1749	Succeeded by Sir John Mordaunt
Honorary titles
Preceded by The Duke of Northumberland	Constable of Windsor Castle; 1716–1723	Succeeded by The Earl of Carlisle
Preceded by The Duke of Bridgwater	Lord Lieutenant of Buckinghamshire; 1728–1738	Succeeded by The Duke of Marlborough
Peerage of Great Britain
New creation	Viscount Cobham; 1718–1749	Succeeded by Hester Temple
New creation	Baron Cobham; 1714–1749	Succeeded by Hester Temple
Baronetage of England
Preceded by Richard Temple	Baronet (of Stowe); 1697–1749	Succeeded by William Temple
