= William FitzMaurice =

William FitzMaurice may refer to:

- William FitzMaurice (Irish politician) (1671–1711), Irish MP for Dingle
- William FitzMaurice, 20th Baron Kerry (1633–1697), Irish peer
- William FitzMaurice, 2nd Earl of Kerry (1694–1747), Irish peer
- William FitzMaurice, 1st Lord of Naas (D.C.1199)
- William Petty FitzMaurice (1737–1805), British Prime Minister from (1782–1783), born William Fitzmaurice
- William FitzMaurice (MP) (1805–1889), British politician
