= Thomas Smith-Dorrien =

Lord Proprietor of the Isles of Scilly from 1872 to 1918

Lieutenant Thomas Dorrien-Smith JP, DL
- Born: Thomas Algernon Smith-Dorrien; 7 February 1846; Berkhamsted, Hertfordshire, United Kingdom
- Died: 6 August 1918 (aged 72)
- Education: Harrow School
- Title: Lord Proprietor of the Isles of Scilly
- Term: 1872–1918
- Predecessor: Augustus Smith
- Successor: Arthur Dorrien-Smith
- Spouse: Edith Anna Maria Tower (m. 1875; died 1892)
- Children: 7 (Including Arthur Dorrien-Smith)
- Parents: Robert Algernon Smith-Dorrien (father); Mary Ann Drever (mother)
- Relatives: Horace Smith-Dorrien (brother); Augustus Smith (uncle); Christopher Theron Tower (father-in-law)
- Military career
- Allegiance: United Kingdom
- Branch: British Army
- Service years: 1864–1874
- Rank: Lieutenant
- Unit: 10th Royal Hussars

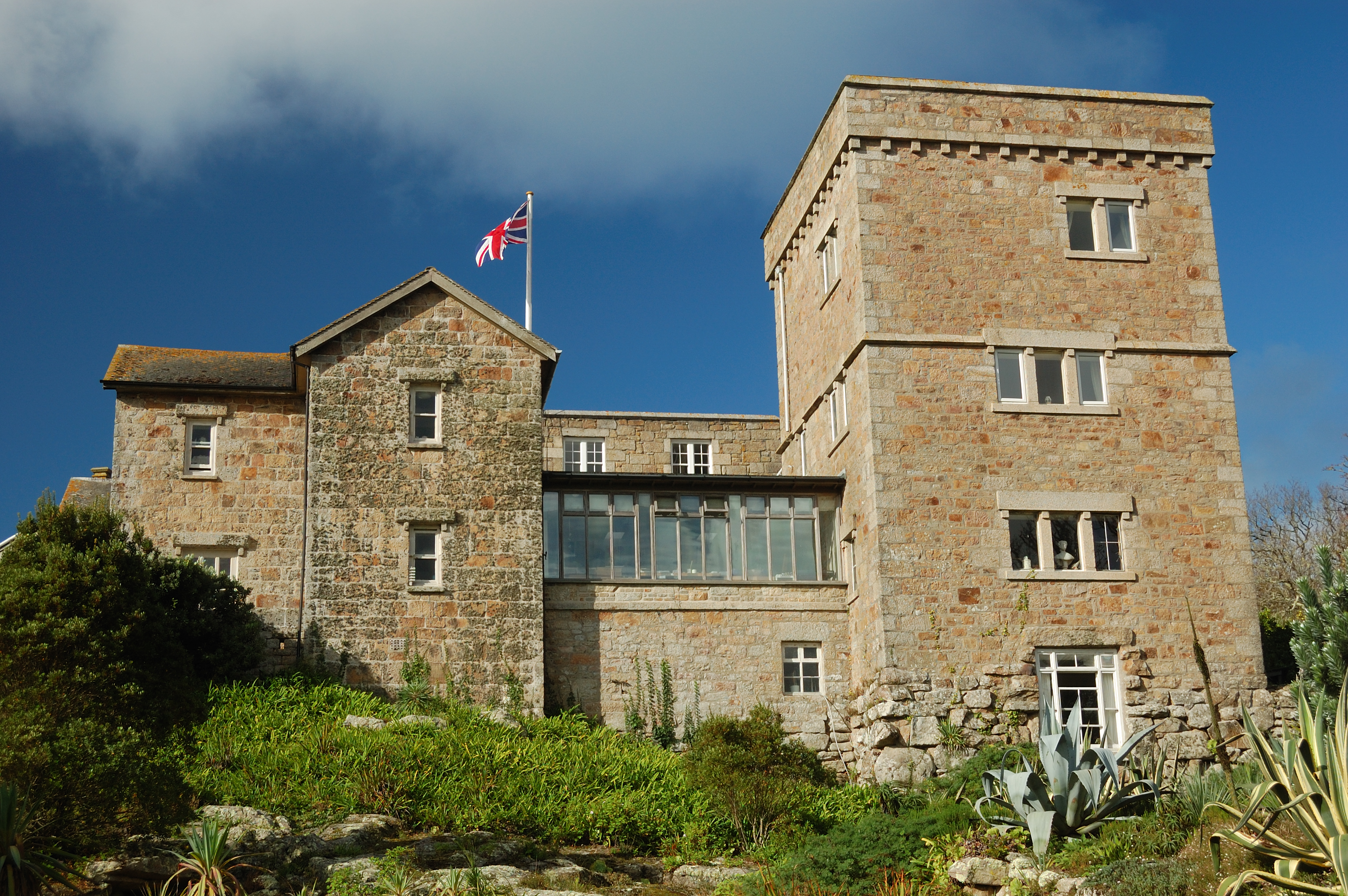
Tresco Abbey, his home on Tresco, Isles of Scilly

Lieutenant Thomas Algernon Smith-Dorrien-Smith JP DL (7 February 1846 – 6 August 1918) was Lord Proprietor of the Isles of Scilly from 1872 until his death in 1918.

== Family ==
Thomas Algernon Smith-Dorrien-Smith was born on 7 February 1846 at Berkhamsted in Hertfordshire. He was the son of Robert Algernon Smith-Dorrien (died 8 October 1879) and Mary Ann Drever. He was given the name of Thomas Algernon Smith-Dorrien at birth. In 1872 he changed his name by Royal Licence to Thomas Algernon Smith-Dorrien-Smith. His younger brother was Horace Smith-Dorrien. He married Edith Anna Maria Tower (died 17 Jan 1892), daughter of Christopher Theron Tower and Lady Sophia Frances Cust, on 8 April 1875 and they had seven children:

- Major Arthur Algernon Smith-Dorrien-Smith (28 January 1876 – 30 May 1955), married on 11 May 1909 Eleanor Salvin Bowlby, daughter of Edward Salvin Bowlby and Elizabeth Vans (née Agnew).
- Mary Sophia Smith-Dorrien-Smith (9 November 1877 – 22 December 1948), married on 3 July 1902 Townshend Evelyn Boscawen, son of Rev. Hon. John Townshend Boscawen and Mary Tremayne.
- Major Edward Pendarves Smith-Dorrien-Smith (26 February 1878 – 12 October 1937), married on 2 June 1915 Frances Amy Salvin Bowlby, daughter of Edward Salvin Bowlby and Elizabeth Vans Agnew.
- Edith Innis Smith-Dorrien-Smith (1 January 1881 – 7 September 1968)
- Cicely Frances Smith-Dorrien-Smith (4 November 1882 – 18 April 1915)
- Gwendolen Smith-Dorrien-Smith (7 November 1883 – 16 April 1969)
- Charlotte Smith-Dorrien-Smith (22 April 1886 – 12 January 1970)

== Career ==
He was educated at Harrow School. From 1864 to 1874 he served in the 10th Royal Hussars achieving the rank of Lieutenant.

He succeeded his uncle, Augustus Smith, as Proprietor of the Isles of Scilly in 1872, and continued the development of the Tresco Abbey Gardens. He designed St Nicholas's Church, which was built between 1877 and 1879. He is considered to be the person who saw the potential for the export of flowers from the Islands, a trade which continues to this day. A week after his marriage, the SS Schiller was wrecked in the Isles of Scilly. William I, German Emperor, awarded him the Order of the Red Eagle and his wife a gold bracelet for their work with survivors.

He was a Justice of the Peace, and later Deputy Lieutenant of Cornwall. He was elected a Member of the British Ornithologists' Union in 1904. A friend, Edward Rodd, in his annual report to the Royal Institution of Cornwall records the number of birds shot by Lt Smith-Dorrien-Smith during the Isles of Scilly shooting season. These were 545 common snipe (Gallinago gallinago), 415 Eurasian woodcock (Scolopax rusticola) and 42 jack snipe (Lymnocryptes minimus). Rodd also received an immature purple heron (Ardea purpurea) and a wood sandpiper (Tringa glareola) for his collection.

Honorary titles
Preceded by Augustus Smith	Lord Proprietor of the Isles of Scilly; 1872–1918	Succeeded by Arthur Dorrien-Smith
