= Robert A. Smith =

Robert A. Smith may refer to:

- Robert Allan Smith (1909–1980), Scottish physicist
- Robert Allen Smith (born 1951), American comic book artist
- Robert Alfred Smith (1933–2010), English footballer
- Robert Angus Smith (1817–1884), Scottish chemist who investigated environmental issues
- Robert Archibald Smith (1780–1829), Scottish composer
- Robert Armstrong Smith (1827-1913), American politician
- Robert Ashley Smith (1890–1965), Major League Baseball (MLB) pitcher for the White Sox, 1913–1915
- Robert Augustus Smith (1869–1942), U.S. Hall of Fame racehorse trainer

== See also ==
- Robert A. Smith (1814–1879), birth name of British soldier and churchwarden Robert Smith-Dorrien
