= James Backwell Praed =

British politician

James Backwell Praed (30 May 1779 – 13 January 1837) was a British politician.

Praed lived at Tyringham in Buckinghamshire. In 1807, he served as High Sheriff of Buckinghamshire.

At the 1835 UK general election, Praed stood in Buckinghamshire for the Conservative Party. He won the seat, and died in office in early 1837.

Parliament of the United Kingdom
Preceded by Richard Temple-Nugent-Brydges-Chandos-Grenville; John Smith; George Dashwood	Member of Parliament for Buckinghamshire; 1835–1837; With: Richard Temple-Nugent-Brydges-Chandos-Grenville; William Young	Succeeded by George Simon Harcourt; Richard Temple-Nugent-Brydges-Chandos-Grenville; William Young
Civic offices
Preceded by Edward Nugent	High Sheriff of Buckinghamshire; 1806	Succeeded by Philip Hoddle Ward
Preceded by Philip Hoddle Ward	High Sheriff of Buckinghamshire; 1807–1808	Succeeded by Richard Dayrell
