= Sir William Young, 4th Baronet =

Politician

Sir William Young Bt

Member of Parliament for Buckinghamshire
- In office 10 January 1835 – 27 June 1842 Serving with Charles Scott-Murray (1841–1842); Caledon Du Pré (1839–1842); George Simon Harcourt (1837–1841); Marquess of Chandos (1835–1839); James Backwell Praed (1835–1837)
- Preceded by: Marquess of Chandos; John Smith; George Dashwood
- Succeeded by: Caledon Du Pré; William FitzMaurice; Christopher Tower

Personal details
- Born: 29 September 1806
- Died: 27 June 1842 (aged 35)
- Party: Conservative

Sir William Laurence Young, 4th Baronet (29 September 1806 – 27 June 1842) was a British Conservative politician.

Young was educated at Brasenose College, Oxford. He was elected Conservative Member of Parliament for Buckinghamshire at the 1835 and held the seat until his death in 1842.

Parliament of the United Kingdom
| Preceded by Marquess of Chandos; John Smith; George Dashwood | Member of Parliament for Buckinghamshire; 1835–1842; With: Charles Scott-Murray (1841–1842); Caledon Du Pré (1839–1842); George Simon Harcourt (1837–1841); Marquess of Chandos (1835–1839); James Backwell Praed (1835–1837) | Succeeded by Caledon Du Pré; William FitzMaurice; Christopher Tower |
Baronetage of Great Britain
| Preceded by William Lawrence Young | Baronet (of Dominica); 1824 – 1842 | Succeeded by William Norris Young |
