= Hand of St James the Apostle =

Relic

The Hand of Saint James the Apostle is a holy relic brought to England by Empress Matilda in the 12th century.

== History ==
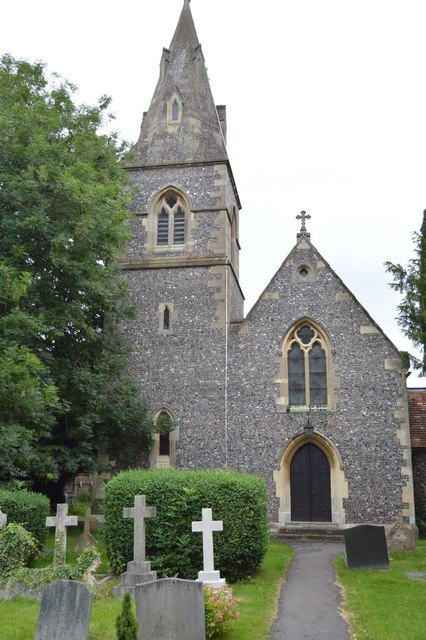
Church of St Peter, Marlow

The first recorded mention of the relic is in 640 when it was in the custody of the Bishop of Torcello, Venice. Around 1072, it was obtained by Henry IV, Holy Roman Emperor for the imperial chapel. The Empress Matilda, widow of Emperor Henry V and daughter of Henry I of England brought it with her when she returned to England. In 1133 her father donated it to Reading Abbey. In 1136 it was acquired by Henry of Blois (later Bishop of Winchester). Matilda's son, Henry II became king in December 1154, and had the relic sent back to Reading the following year. Shortly thereafter, Emperor Frederick Barbarossa asked for the return of Saint James's Hand. Instead, Henry sent him a magnificent tent, which Frederick used on his Italian campaigns. Both Frederick and Henry regarded the relic as a symbol of dynastic restoration.

In the thirteenth century, the relic was used in healing miracles, which attracted many pilgrims to the Abbey.

In 1539 at the Dissolution of the Monasteries, English monks hid the hand in an iron chest in the walls of Reading Abbey. It was dug up again in 1786 by workmen and given to Reading Museum. Around 1845 it was sold to Charles Robert Scott-Murray, who put it in his private chapel at Danesfield House. On his death in 1882 he gave it to St Peter's Church in Great Marlow (now Marlow), which is where it resides today. In 2011 it was loaned to the Church of St James in Reading for three days to mark the Feast of St James. The event was sponsored by the Confraternity of St James.

Radiocarbon dating has confirmed it is not sufficiently old to be the hand of an apostle
