= Caledon Du Pré =

English politician

Caledon George Du Pré (28 March 1803 – 7 October 1886) was an English Conservative Party politician who sat in the House of Commons from 1839 to 1874.

Du Pré was the son of James Du Pré of Wilton Park Estate, Beaconsfield, and his wife Madelina Maxwell, daughter of Sir William Maxwell, 4th Baronet. His father was MP for Gatton, Aylesbury and Chichester. Du Pré was an officer in the 1st Life Guards and became a J.P. and Deputy Lieutenant for Buckinghamshire.

In February 1839, Du Pré was elected at a by-election as a Member of Parliament (MP) for Buckinghamshire. He held the seat until the 1874 general election, when he did not stand for re-election.

Du Pré died at the age of 83.

Du Pré married his cousin Louisa Cornwallis Maxwell, daughter of Sir William Maxwell, 5th Baronet.

Parliament of the United Kingdom
Preceded by Marquess of Chandos; Sir William Young; George Simon Harcourt	Member of Parliament for Buckinghamshire; 1839–1874; With: Sir William Young to 1842; George Simon Harcourt to 1841; Charles Scott-Murray 1841–1845; William FitzMaurice 1842–1847; Christopher Tower 1845–1847; Benjamin Disraeli 1847–1876; Charles Cavendish 1847–57; William Cavendish 1857–63; Robert Harvey 1863–68; Nathaniel Lambert 1868–80	Succeeded by Sir Robert Harvey; Nathaniel Lambert; Benjamin Disraeli
