= St Peter's Church, Marlow =

Coordinates: 51.5697°N 0.7718°W

St Peter's Church
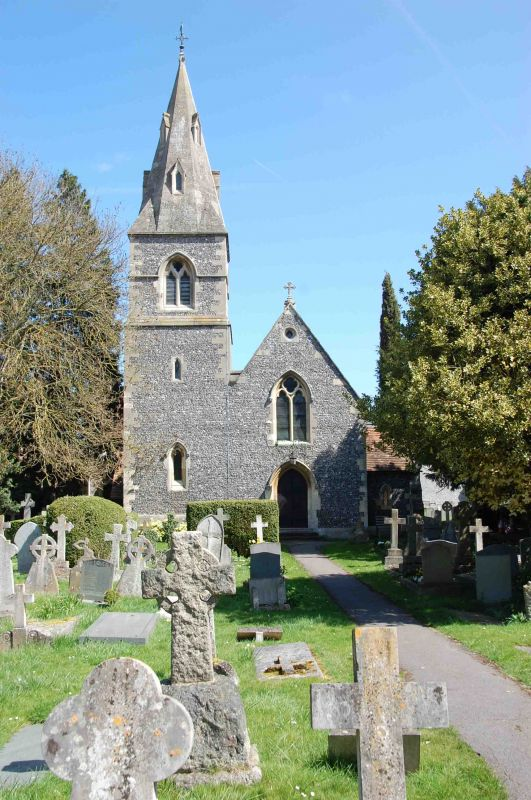
- St Peter's Church
- OS grid reference: SU 85216 86361
- Location: Marlow, Buckinghamshire
- Country: England
- Denomination: Roman Catholic
- Website: St-Peters-Marlow.org.uk

History
- Status: Active
- Founded: 1844
- Founder: Charles Scott-Murray
- Dedication: Saint Peter

Architecture
- Functional status: Parish church
- Heritage designation: Grade II listed
- Designated: 16 July 1949
- Architect: Augustus Pugin
- Style: Gothic Revival
- Completed: 1846

Administration
- Province: Westminster
- Diocese: Northampton
- Parish: Marlow

St Peter's Church is a Catholic parish church in Marlow, Buckinghamshire. It started from a mission church founded in 1844 and was completed in 1846. It was designed by Augustus Pugin in the Gothic Revival style and founded by Charles Scott-Murray. It was the first new Catholic church built in Buckinghamshire since the Reformation, one of the last designed by Pugin and contains the Hand of St James the Apostle, a relic of St James the Apostle's left hand. It is located between St Peter Street and Mill Road near the centre of Marlow. In 1970, an extension was built connected to the church on its northeast side. It was designed by Francis Pollen. It is a Grade II listed building.

== History ==
=== Foundation ===
After the English Reformation, during the time of recusancy, there were no new Catholic churches built in Buckinghamshire. The first to be built was St Peter's Church. In 1844, a mission was started in Marlow. A convert to Catholicism, the local member of Parliament for Buckinghamshire, Charles Scott-Murray subsidised the mission. From his time in Oxford University he was influenced by John Henry Newman and joined the Catholic Church while visiting Rome. He endowed the mission with £2,000 for a priest of his choosing to visit Marlow and minister to the Catholics there. Masses were celebrated in the premises that stood where church currently is and were only attended by three people.

=== Construction ===
Scott-Murray wanted a church built in the town. He donated the piece of land that the current church is on. He spoke with the Vicar Apostolic of the Midland District and later Archbishop of Westminster, Nicholas Wiseman about a suitable architect. Wiseman recommended Augustus Pugin, and he went on to design the entire church, exterior and interior. The windows were made by Hardman & Co. Scott-Murray funded the construction of the church, and the Earl of Shrewsbury, Charles Chetwynd-Talbot also participated in its creation. In 1846, seventeen years after the Roman Catholic Relief Act 1829, and four years before the Restoration of the dioceses, the church was opened.

=== Extension ===
In 1970, with the Catholic congregation of the church growing, an extension was needed. As the church had been listed since 1949, the extensions had to be built keeping in mind the original character of the church. So an extension was built, which included its own chancel and altar to the northeast of the church so that it cannot be seen from the street. It was designed by Francis Pollen and did not disturb the original fittings and interior of the Pugin-designed church, and can be accessed through the lady chapel.

== Parish ==
The church has its own parish. Within the parish is St Peter's Catholic Primary School, situated on Prospect Road in Marlow. The church has three Sunday Masses: 9:00 am, 11:00 am and 5:30 pm.

== Exterior ==
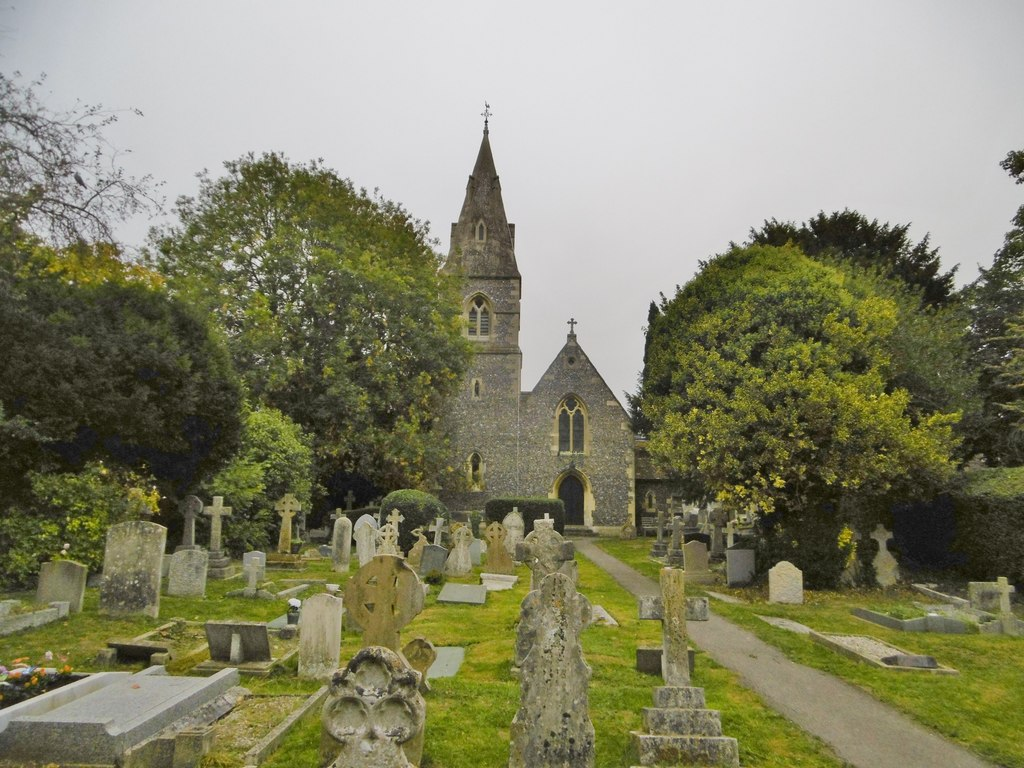
Churchyard and cemetery

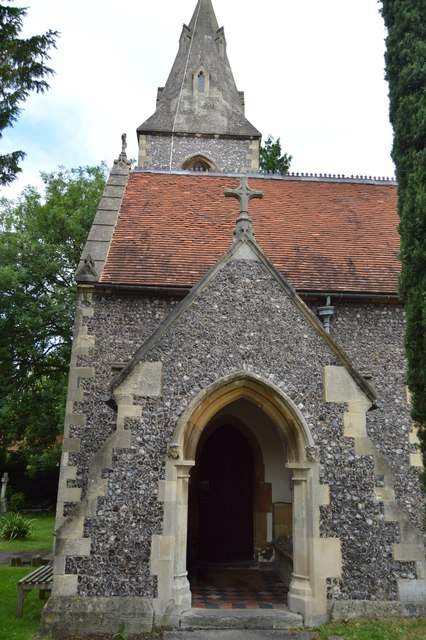
Doorway

== See also ==
- Diocese of Northampton
