= Horace Smith-Dorrien =

British Army General (1858–1930)

General Sir Horace Smith-Dorrien GCB GCMG DSO
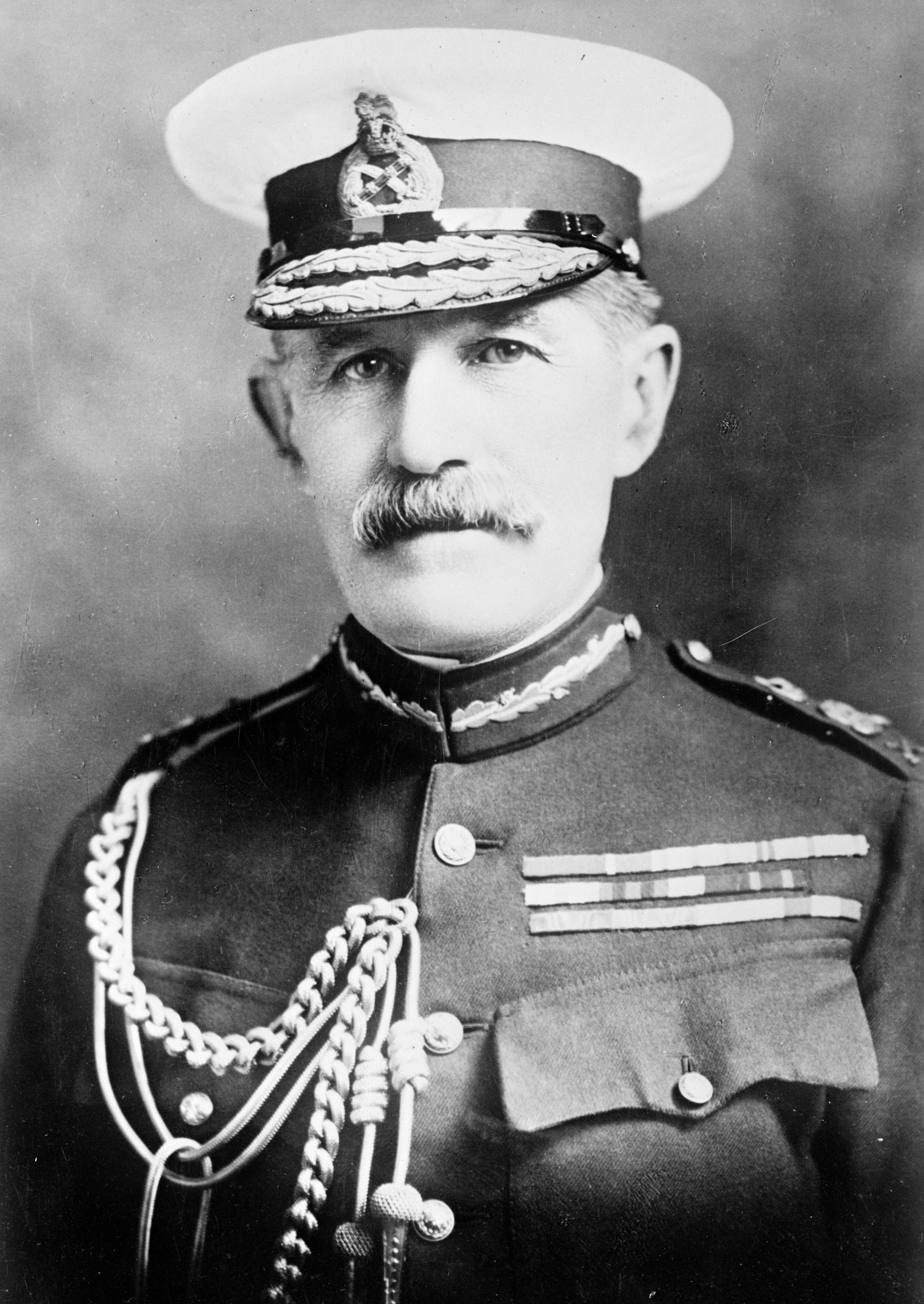
- Smith-Dorrien, 1913–1917
- Born: 26 May 1858; Haresfoot, Berkhamsted, Hertfordshire, England
- Died: 12 August 1930 (aged 72); Chippenham, Wiltshire, England
- Military career
- Allegiance: United Kingdom
- Branch: British Army
- Service years: 1876–1923
- Rank: General
- Nicknames: "Smith Doreen"; Smith D. S.D. Smithereens
- Unit: Sherwood Foresters
- Commands: Second Army; II Corps; Southern Command; 19th Brigade
- Conflicts: Anglo-Zulu War; Battle of Isandlwana; Mahdist War; Battle of Gennis; Battle of Omdurman; Tirah Campaign; Second Boer War; Battle of Paardeberg; Sanna's Post; Battle of Leliefontein; First World War; Battle of Mons; Battle of Le Cateau; First Battle of the Marne; First Battle of the Aisne; First Battle of Ypres; Second Battle of Ypres
- Awards: Knight Grand Cross of the Order of the Bath; Knight Grand Cross of the Order of St Michael and St George; Distinguished Service Order; Mentioned in Despatches; Grand Officer of the Legion of Honour (France)
- Other work: Governor of Gibraltar

General Sir Horace Lockwood Smith-Dorrien, GCB, GCMG, DSO (26 May 1858 – 12 August 1930) was a British Army General. One of the few British survivors of the Battle of Isandlwana as a young officer, he also distinguished himself in the Second Boer War.

Smith-Dorrien held senior commands in the British Expeditionary Force (BEF) during the First World War. He commanded II Corps at the Battle of Mons, the first major action fought by the BEF, and the Battle of Le Cateau, where he fought a vigorous and successful defensive action contrary to the wishes of the Commander-in-Chief Sir John French, with whom he had had a personality clash dating back some years. In the spring of 1915 he commanded the Second Army at the Second Battle of Ypres. He was relieved of command by French for requesting permission to retreat from the Ypres Salient to a more defensible position.

== Early life ==
Horace Smith-Dorrien was born at Haresfoot, a house near Berkhamsted, in the county of Hertfordshire to Colonel Robert Algernon Smith-Dorrien and Mary Ann Drever. He was the twelfth child of sixteen; his eldest brother was Thomas Smith-Dorrien-Smith, the Lord Proprietor of the Isles of Scilly from 1872 until 1918. Another elder brother was Rear-Admiral Arthur Hale Smith-Dorrien. He was educated at Harrow School and on 26 February 1876 entered the Royal Military College, Sandhurst.

== Career ==
On graduation from the Royal Military College in 1877 he had hoped to receive an infantry commission with the 95th Rifle Brigade, but instead received one with the 95th (Derbyshire) Regiment of Foot, later to become the Sherwood Foresters.

== Zulu War ==
On 1 November 1878, he was posted to South Africa where he was employed as a Transport Officer. He was present at the Battle of Isandlwana during the Anglo-Zulu War on 22 January 1879, serving with the British invasion force as a transport officer for a detachment of Royal Artillery. As the Zulu impis overwhelmed the British lines, destroying it in hand-to-hand fighting, Smith-Dorrien narrowly escaped on his transport pony over 20 miles of rough terrain with twenty Zulu warriors in running pursuit, crossing the Buffalo River, 80 yards wide and with a strong current, by holding the tail of a loose horse. Smith-Dorrien was one of fewer than fifty British survivors from the battle (many more native African troops on the British side also survived), and one of only five Imperial officers to escape it with his life. Because of his conduct in trying to help other soldiers escape from the battlefield, including a colonial commissariat officer named Hamer whose life he saved, he was recommended for the Victoria Cross, but it was not awarded. He took part in the rest of that war. His observations on the difficulty of opening ammunition boxes led to changes in British Army practice for the rest of the war (though modern commentators argue that this was not as important a factor in the defeat as was thought at the time).

== Egypt, India and Sudan ==
Smith-Dorrien served in Egypt under Evelyn Wood. He was promoted captain on 1 April 1882, appointed assistant chief of police in Alexandria on 22 August 1882, then given command of Mounted Infantry in Egypt on 3 September 1882, and was seconded to the Egyptian Army (1 February 1884). During this time, he forged a lifelong friendship with the then Major Herbert Kitchener. He met Charles George Gordon more than once, but his bad knee kept him off the expedition to relieve Khartoum. He served on the Suakin Expedition. On 30 December 1885, he witnessed the Battle of Gennis, where the British Army fought in red coats for the last time. The next day (31 December 1885) he was given his first independent command, 150 men (a mixture of hussars, mounted infantry and Egyptians) with fifty infantry in reserve. His task was to capture nine Arab river supply boats (nuggars), to achieve which he had to exceed his orders by going beyond the village of Surda, making a 60-mile journey on horseback in 24 hours. For this, he was awarded the Distinguished Service Order (DSO) in 1886.

Smith-Dorrien then left active command to go to the Staff College, Camberley (1887–89). Staff College was not yet much respected, and he later recorded that he devoted much time to sport while there.

He was posted to India, and promoted major on 11 May 1892. He became Deputy Assistant Adjutant-General, Bengal, on 1 April 1893 and then Assistant Adjutant General, Bengal, on 27 October 1894. He returned to his regiment where he commanded troops during the Tirah Campaign of 1897–98.

In 1898, he transferred back to Egypt. He was promoted brevet lieutenant-colonel on 20 May 1898 and appointed Commanding Officer of the 13th Sudanese Battalion (16 July 1898). He fought at the Battle of Omdurman (2 September 1898), where his infantry fired at Devishes from entrenched positions. He commanded the British troops during the Fashoda incident. He was promoted brevet colonel 16 November 1898 and Commanding Officer of the Sherwood Foresters and substantive lieutenant-colonel (1 January 1899).

== South Africa ==
On 31 October 1899, he shipped to South Africa for the Second Boer War, arriving at Durban 13 December 1899, in the middle of "Black Week". On 2 February 1900, Lord Roberts put him in command of the 19th Brigade and, on 11 February, he was promoted to major general, making him one of the youngest generals in the British Army at the time. He later commanded a division in South Africa.

He provided covering fire for French's Cavalry Division at Klipsdrift, and played an important role at the Battle of Paardeberg (18 to 27 February 1900), where he was summoned by Lord Roberts and asked for his views in the presence of Lord Kitchener, French and Henry Colvile. He argued for the use of sapping and fire support, rather than attacking the entrenched enemy over open ground. Kitchener followed him to his horse to remonstrate that he would be "a made man" if he attacked as Kitchener wished, to which he replied he had given his views and would only attack if ordered to do so. A week later he took the laager after careful assault.

At Sanna's Post (31 March 1900), Smith-Dorrien ignored inept orders from Colvile to leave wounded largely unprotected and managed an orderly retreat without further casualties. He took part in the Battle of Leliefontein (7 November 1900). On 6 February 1901, Smith-Dorrien's troops were attacked in the Battle of Chrissiesmeer.

Smith-Dorrien's qualities as a commander meant he was one of few British commanders to enhance his reputation during this war. Smith-Dorrien was mentioned three times in despatches in The London Gazette (including by Lord Kitchener dated 23 June 1902), and Ian Hamilton later wrote highly of his performance and his grasp of the men's morale, while Roberts also thought highly of his South Africa performance. He was at the top of a list (21 September 1901) of eighteen successful commanders of columns or groups of columns, including Douglas Haig and Edmund Allenby, whom French commended to Lord Roberts.

== India ==
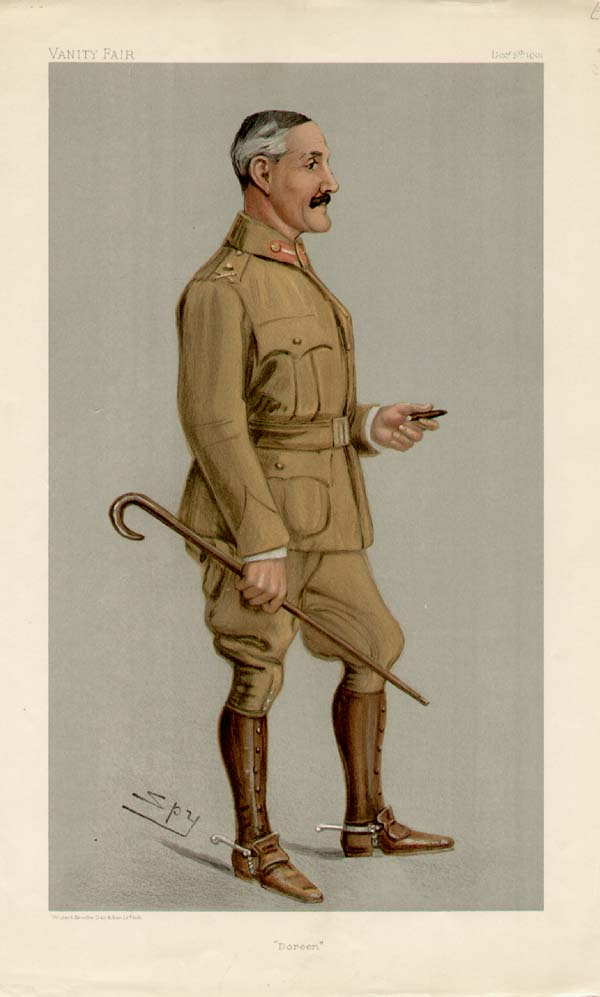
Smith-Dorrien caricatured by Spy for Vanity Fair, 1901

On 22 April 1901, he received orders to return to India where he was made Adjutant-General (6 November 1901) under Kitchener (who returned to India after the end of the Second Boer War, in late 1902). He was placed in command of the 4th (Quetta) Division in Baluchistan, a post he held from 30 June 1903 until 1907. He was raised to Knight Commander of the Order of the Bath (KCB) in 1904, made colonel of the Sherwood Foresters in July 1905, and promoted lieutenant general on 9 April 1906. He introduced the staff ride, erroneously attributed by John Terraine to Haig. He also helped found the Staff College at Quetta in 1907.

Smith-Dorrien remained neutral in the dispute between Kitchener (Commander-in-Chief, India) and the Viceroy Lord Curzon. Kitchener's predecessor, Sir Arthur Power Palmer, was his wife's uncle.

== Aldershot ==
Smith-Dorrien returned to England and, on 1 December 1907, became General Officer Commanding (GOC) of the Aldershot Command. Unlike many senior generals of the era, Smith-Dorrien could speak to troops with ease and was greatly admired by regimental officers. In prewar training he wanted "individual initiative and intelligence" in British soldiers. He later wrote: "one could never become an up-to-date soldier in the prehistoric warfare to be met with against the Dervishes". Smith-Dorrien improved the frequency and methods of training in marksmanship of all soldiers (including cavalry, and including shooting at moving targets). During this period, the higher ranks of the army were divided on the best use of cavalry. Smith-Dorrien, along with Lord Roberts, Sir Ian Hamilton and others, doubted that cavalry could often be used as cavalry, i.e. that they should still be trained to charge with sword and lance, instead thinking they would be more often deployed as mounted infantry, i.e. using horses for mobility but dismounting to fight. To this end, he took steps to improve the marksmanship of the cavalry. This did not endear him to the arme blanche ('pro-cavalry') faction, which included French and Sir Douglas Haig, and whose views prevailed after the retirement of Lord Roberts.

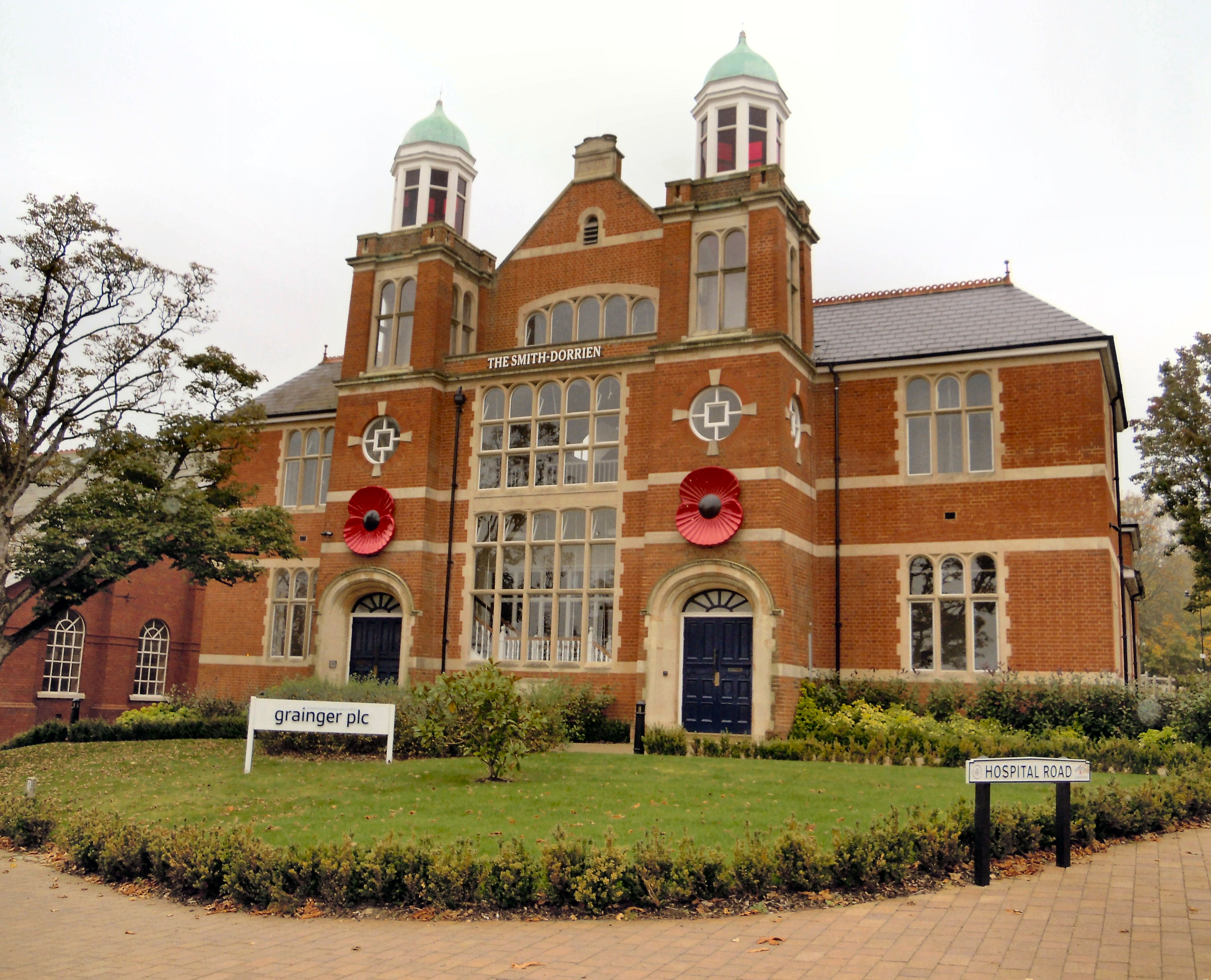
Smith-Dorrien House in Aldershot was named in his honour

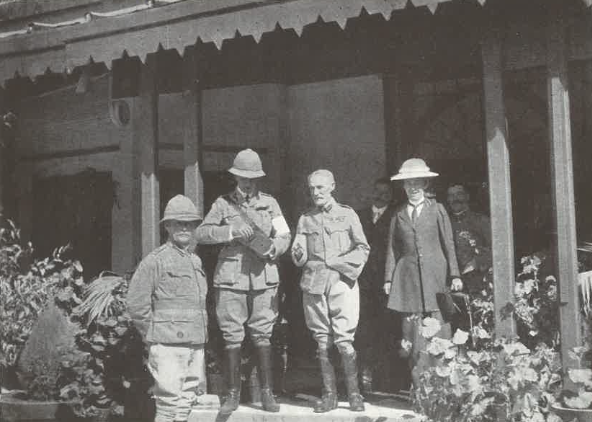
Archibald Hunter, John Cowans, Horace Smith-Dorrien and Mrs Adam outside Smith-Dorrien's bungalow in Quetta, India, c. 1907

At Aldershot, Smith-Dorrien instituted a number of reforms designed to improve the lot of the ordinary soldier. He abandoned the practice of posting pickets to trawl the streets for drunk soldiers outside the base, more than doubled the number of playing fields available to the men, cut down trees, and built new and better barracks. His reforms earned many plaudits but were treated as an implied criticism by his predecessor, Sir John French, with whom he had still been on relatively cordial terms at the end of the South African War. Aylmer Haldane recorded that at the 1909 manoeuvres French was "unfair" in summing up for Arthur Paget against Smith-Dorrien. On 21 August 1909 he lectured all his cavalry officers – in the 16th Lancers’ mess – about the importance of improving their men's musketry. He also tried to get the army to replace the old Maxim gun with the new Vickers machine gun, which weighed less than half as much and had a better water-cooling system but the War Office did not approve the expenditure.

By 1910 the feud between French and Smith-Dorrien was common knowledge throughout the Army. Smith-Dorrien objected to French's womanising, a fact which Richard Holmes attributes in part to Smith-Dorrien being happily married to a young and pretty wife; French's nephew later claimed to have overheard "a ferocious exchange" between them, in which Smith-Dorrien declared "Too many whores around your headquarters, Field-Marshal".

In July 1910, he was made aide-de-camp to King George V. He was part of the King's hunt in the Chitwan area of Nepal; on 19 December 1911, Smith-Dorrien killed a rhino and on the following day shot a bear.

== Southern Command ==
On 1 March 1912, he was appointed GOC Southern Command, taking over from General Sir Charles Douglas while Haig had succeeded him as GOC Aldershot. At Southern Command he had jurisdiction over twelve counties and many regimental depots. He had experience of dealing with Territorials (who would make up much of II Corps in 1914) for the first time and instigated training on fire-and-movement withdrawals which would also prove useful at Le Cateau. He was promoted to full general (10 August 1912) and raised to Knight Grand Cross of the Order of the Bath (GCB) in 1913.

Although Smith-Dorrien was perfectly urbane and, by the standards of the day, kind-hearted towards his troops, he was notorious for furious outbursts of bad temper, which could last for hours before his equilibrium was restored. It has been suggested that the pain from a knee injury was one cause of his ill temper. It was rumoured that Smith-Dorrien's temper was caused by some kind of serious illness. Reginald Brett, 2nd Viscount Esher (a royal courtier who exercised great influence over military appointments) had dined with Smith-Dorrien (28 January 1908) to see if he was indeed "changed and weakened". Lord Crewe (letter to John Seely 5 September 1913) turned him down for the post of Commander-in-Chief, India because of his foul temper (A.J. Smithers, probably wrongly, blames French's enmity for denying Smith-Dorrien the promotion). Unlike French, he was politically astute enough to avoid becoming entangled in the Curragh incident of 1914. Unlike a number of British generals of the era, Smith-Dorrien was not a political intriguer.

== First World War ==
In 1914, the Public Schools Officers' Training Corps annual camp was held at Tidworth Pennings, near Salisbury Plain. Lord Kitchener was to review the cadets, but the imminence of the war kept him elsewhere, and Smith-Dorrien was sent instead. He surprised the two-or-three thousand cadets by declaring (in the words of Donald Christopher Smith, a Bermudian cadet who was present) "that war should be avoided at almost any cost, that war would solve nothing, that the whole of Europe and more besides would be reduced to ruin, and that the loss of life would be so large that whole populations would be decimated. In our ignorance I, and many of us, felt almost ashamed of a British General who uttered such depressing and unpatriotic sentiments, but during the next four years, those of us who survived the holocaust – probably not more than one-quarter of us – learned how right the General's prognosis was and how courageous he had been to utter it."

With the outbreak of the First World War, he was given command of the Home Defence Army, part of Ian Hamilton's Home Defence Central Force. However, following the sudden death of Sir James Grierson, he was placed in charge of the British Expeditionary Force II Corps, by Lord Kitchener, the new Secretary of State for War. Field Marshal Sir John French had wanted Sir Herbert Plumer but Kitchener chose Smith-Dorrien as he knew he could stand up to French, and in the full knowledge that French disliked him. Kitchener admitted to Smith-Dorrien that he had doubts about appointing him, but put them to one side.

Smith-Dorrien arrived at GHQ (20 August) and formally asked French's permission to keep a special diary to report privately to the King as His Majesty had requested. French could hardly refuse, but this further worsened their relations. Smith-Dorrien later claimed in his memoirs that French had received him "pleasantly", but his diary at the time simply records matter-of-factly that he "motored into Le Cateau and saw the Commander-in-Chief" which may be suspiciously brief in contrast to the diary's normally detailed description of other events. There was also personal friction between George Forestier-Walker and Johnnie Gough, the chiefs of staff of II Corps and I Corps respectively.

=== Mons (23 August 1914) ===
French still believed (22 August) that there were only light German forces facing the BEF, but after hearing intelligence that German forces were stronger than thought and that the BEF had moved far ahead of Charles Lanrezac's Fifth French Army on its right, Sir John cancelled the planned further advance. He told Lanrezac that he would hold his current position for another 24 hours.

French's and Smith-Dorrien's accounts differ about the conference at 5.30 am on 23 August. French's account in his memoirs "1914" stated that he had become doubtful of the advance into Belgium and warned his officers to be ready to attack or retreat. This agrees largely with French's diary at the time, in which he wrote that he had warned Smith-Dorrien that the Mons position might not be tenable. When "1914" was published, Smith-Dorrien claimed that French had been "in excellent form" at the meeting and had still been planning to advance. However, in his own memoirs Smith-Dorrien admitted that French had talked of either attacking or retreating, although he claimed that it had been he who had warned that the Mons position was untenable. James Edward Edmonds in the "Official History" agreed that French had probably been prepared either to attack or to retreat. Edmonds – who was not an eyewitness – later claimed in his memoirs that French had instructed Smith-Dorrien to "give battle" on the line of the Conde Canal, and that when Smith-Dorrien queried whether he was to attack or defend he was simply told, after French had whispered with Archibald Murray, "Don’t ask questions, do as you are told".

Smith-Dorrien's II Corps took the brunt of a heavy assault by the German forces at Mons, with the Germans under Alexander von Kluck attempting a flanking manoeuvre. Forestier-Walker, Chief of Staff II Corps, was driven by Smith-Dorrien's foul temper to attempt to resign his post during the Battle of Mons but was told by the BEF Chief of Staff Murray "not to be an ass". During the battle of Mons Smith-Dorrien's car was almost struck by a German shell.

=== Retreat to Le Cateau (24–25 August) ===
French ordered a general retreat, during which I Corps (under Lt-General Douglas Haig) and II Corps became separated, II Corps marching down an old Roman road west of the Forest of Mormal, and I Corps marching to the east of that dense forest. French agreed to Haig's retreat east of the Forest (Haig Diary, 24 August) without, apparently, the initial knowledge of Smith-Dorrien. Joseph Joffre had intended that both BEF Corps should pass west of the Forest. Smith-Dorrien was at GHQ at Bavay at 1800 on 24 August – he sought orders from Sir John, but was told to do as he pleased and that Haig would be starting at 0500 the next morning. Smith-Dorrien later recorded that he "remonstrated" with Sir John that he wanted to begin his retreat soon after midnight and have his rearguard underway by 0500, to lessen the risk of their being pressed by the Germans, and that Sir John "concurred", but that Haig could still move east of the Forest as he intended. Smith-Dorrien recorded that he "implored" Murray to issue an order that both Corps were to move west of the Forest. Smith-Dorrien's biographer AJ Smithers believes it more likely that he "bullied" Murray into issuing an order, and is highly critical of Sir John for failing to "grip" the situation. Orders were finally issued at 2015, and were later published as Appendix XIII of the relevant volume of the Official History. Prior to the publication of the Official History, Sir John had falsely claimed in his unreliable memoirs (1914) that he had already issued the orders at 1500.

Murray noted in his diary (25 August) that GHQ had moved back from Le Cateau to St Quentin and that I Corps was being heavily engaged by night (at Landrecies) – making no mention of II Corps's situation. Because the German plan was to envelop the BEF from the west, most of their pressure fell on II Corps, which had already suffered higher casualties (2,000) in its fighting withdrawal on 24–25 August than at Mons the previous day (1,600). Smith-Dorrien later remarked on Sir John's failure to explain in his memoirs how the eight-mile gap between the two British corps had come about, that had it been he rather than Haig who had ignored orders Sir John would have criticised him for it, and that had the order been followed both BEF Corps would have been concentrated at Le Cateau by the night of 25/26 August under Sir John's personal command.

=== Le Cateau (26 August) ===
French had a long discussion with Murray and Henry Hughes Wilson (25 August) as to whether the BEF should stand and fight at Le Cateau, a position which had been chosen for both I and II Corps to hold after they had retreated on either side of the Forest of Mormal. II Corps had been harried by German forces as it retreated west of the forest and Sir John wanted to fall back as agreed with Joffre and hoped that the BEF could pull out of the fight altogether and refit behind the River Oise. Wilson issued orders to Smith-Dorrien to retreat from Le Cateau the next day.

On the evening of 25 August 1914 Smith-Dorrien was unable to locate the 4th Division and Cavalry Division. Allenby (GOC Cavalry Division) reached him at 2 am on 26 August 1914, and reported that his horses and men were "pretty well played out", and unless they retreated under cover of darkness there would be no choice but to fight in the morning. Allenby agreed to act under Smith-Dorrien's orders. Hubert Hamilton (GOC 3rd Division) also reported that his men would be unable to get away before 9 am, which also left little choice but to fight, lest isolated forces be overwhelmed piecemeal by the Germans. A French cavalry corps under André Sordet, and especially its artillery, also took part on the west flank.

French was awakened at 2 am on 26 August 1914 with news that Haig's I Corps was under attack at Landrecies, and ordered Smith-Dorrien (3:50 am) to assist him. Smith-Dorrien replied that he was "unable to move a man". This irritated French, as Haig (who already had serious doubts about French's competence) was a protégé of his.

Smith-Dorrien finally managed to locate Thomas Snow (GOC of the newly arrived 4th Division), at 5:00 am (his brigades were assembling in their positions between 3:30 am and 5:30 am). He was not under Smith-Dorrien's orders but agreed to assist II Corps. Smith-Dorrien then cancelled his order to retreat and decided to stand and fight at Le Cateau. He still hoped for assistance from I Corps (Haig), which did not reach its intended position to the immediate east of Le Cateau. This news reached French at 5:00 am – woken from his sleep once again, and insisting that the exhausted Murray not be woken, he telegraphed back that he still wanted Smith-Dorrien to "make every endeavour" to fall back but that he had "a free hand as to the method", which Smith-Dorrien took as handing him permission to make a stand. On waking properly, French ordered Wilson to telephone Smith-Dorrien and order him to break off as soon as possible. Wilson ended the conversation – by his own account – by saying "Good luck to you. Yours is the first cheerful voice I've heard in three days." Smith-Dorrien's slightly different recollection was that Wilson had warned him that he risked another Sedan.

Von Kluck believed that he was facing the entire BEF (numbering, he believed, six divisions) and hoped to envelop it on both flanks to its destruction, but lack of coordination among the German attacking forces thwarted this ambition.

=== After Le Cateau ===
Smith-Dorrien's decision to stand and fight enraged French, who accused him of jeopardising the whole BEF. French and his staff believed that II Corps had been destroyed at Le Cateau, although its units reappeared and reassembled after the retreat. Haig, despite believing French to be incompetent, wrote in his journal (4 September 1914) of Smith-Dorrien's "ill-considered decision" in electing to stand and fight at Le Cateau. Murray later (in 1933) called Smith-Dorrien "a straight honourable gentleman, most lovable, kind and generous" but thought he "did wrong to fight other than a strong rearguard action". However, the historian John Terraine praised Smith-Dorrien's decision, arguing that despite heavy casualties sustained by II Corps in the action, it materially slowed the German advance.

GHQ (French) fell back to Noyon on 26 August 1914, and then and the next day Huguet and other French-national liaison officers attached to it gave Joffre a tale with their communications of shattered British forces falling back from Le Cateau in defeat. In fact Smith-Dorrien's staff had held II Corps' formation together, although at a meeting (held at 2 am on 27 August 1914, as Smith-Dorrien had found GHQ's present location with great difficulty) French accused him of being overly optimistic.

Smith-Dorrien (2 September 1914) recorded that his men were much fitter and had recovered their spirits after the Le Cateau engagement. Smith-Dorrien's II Corps led the counter-attack upon the German advance at the subsequent First Battle of the Marne and the First Battle of the Aisne, Haig's I Corps to his right being delayed by forests in its path of advance.

II Corps, with its heavy casualties was effectively temporarily broken up in late October 1914 to reinforce I Corps (Haig), but Smith-Dorrien was given command of the newly formed British Second Army when it was reconstituted on 26 December 1914. His writings from the time show that he was fully aware of the importance of artillery, machine guns and aircraft working in close cooperation with the infantry.

Smith-Dorrien later recorded that General French inflicted "pin-pricks" on him from February 1915 onwards, including the removal of Forestier-Walker as his chief of staff. This was supposedly on the grounds that Forestier-Walker was needed to command a division training in England, although two months later he was still waiting to receive its command. French told Haig that Smith-Dorrien was "a weak spot" (5 February 1915). During the Battle of Neuve Chapelle he was dissatisfied (13 March 1915) at the apparent "lack of determination" of Smith-Dorrien's diversionary attacks. Smith-Dorrien was not always immune to the excessive optimism which British officers were expected to display throughout the war: Aylmer Haldane recorded in his diary on 15 March 1915 that prior to the battle Smith-Dorrien had been claiming that the war would be won in March 1915. French complained to Kitchener (Secretary of State for War) about him on 28 March 1915.

=== Second Battle of Ypres ===
At the Second Battle of Ypres, the British were defending a barely-tenable salient of ground, held at great cost at the First Battle of Ypres five months earlier. On 22 April 1915 the Germans used poison gas on the Western Front for the first time, and heavy casualties were sustained by the British and French troops.

On 27 April 1915, with a French counterattack to the north of the salient materialising later and on a smaller-scale than promised, Smith-Dorrien recommended withdrawal to the more defensible "GHQ Line". French privately agreed with this analysis, but was angered that the suggestion came from Smith-Dorrien. French wanted the situation kept quiet so as not to distract from the upcoming attack upon Aubers Ridge by Haig's First Army (one historian describes this behaviour on French's part as "cretinous"). Smith-Dorrien wrote a long letter on 27 April 1915 explaining the situation to Robertson (then French's Chief of Staff BEF). He received in response a curt telephone message telling him that, in French's view, he had adequate troops to defend the salient. A few hours later written orders arrived, directing Smith-Dorrien to turn command of the salient over to Herbert Plumer and to lend Plumer his chief of staff and such other staff officers as Plumer required. (In practice this meant that Plumer's V Corps, already holding the salient, became an autonomous force reporting directly to GHQ, with Smith-Dorrien left only with II Corps south of the salient). Plumer immediately asked permission for a withdrawal almost identical to that proposed by Smith-Dorrien. After a delay while Foch conducted another counterattack, French consented to the action.

On 30 April 1915, Haig wrote in his diary:

Sir John also told me Smith-Dorrien had caused him much trouble. 'He was quite unfit [(he said)] to hold the Command of an Army' so Sir J. had withdrawn all troops from him control except the II Corps. Yet Smith-D. stayed on! [He would not resign!] French is to ask Lord Kitchener to find something to do at home. ... He also alluded to Smith-Dorrien's conduct on the retreat, and said he ought to have tried him by Court Martial, because (on the day of Le Cateau) he 'had ordered him to retire at 8 am and he did not attempt to do so [but insisted on fighting in spite of his orders to retire'].

After French refused permission to retreat, Smith-Dorrien noted (6 May 1915) that the planned counterattack was a complete failure with casualties higher than predicted by GHQ. Smith-Dorrien's offer to resign his command on 6 May 1915 was ignored, and on that same day French used the 'pessimism' of the withdrawal recommendation as an excuse to sack him from command of Second Army altogether. "Wully" Robertson is said to have broken the news to him with the words " 'Orace, yer for 'ome " (Robertson was a former cavalry trooper [enlisted man] who dropped his aitches), although by another account he might have said " 'Orace, yer thrown " (a cavalry metaphor).

The Official Historian Brigadier Edmonds later alleged that French had removed Smith-Dorrien as he was senior to Haig and stood in the way of Haig becoming Commander-in-Chief, and that Wilson had put the idea in French's mind, but this may be doubtful as their antipathy went back a long way, and French was later (December 1915) replaced by Douglas Haig as Commander-in-Chief of the BEF against his will.

Smith-Dorrien was raised to Knight Grand Cross of the Order of St Michael and St George in the 1915 Birthday Honours and was briefly appointed GOC First Home Army (22 June 1915).

=== Remainder of the war ===
After a period in Britain commanding First Army of Central Force, Smith-Dorrien was appointed GOC East Africa (22 November 1915) to fight the Germans in German East Africa (present day Tanzania, Rwanda, and Burundi) but pneumonia contracted during the voyage to South Africa prevented him from taking command. His former adversary, Jan Smuts, took on this command. Smith-Dorrien took no significant military part in the rest of the war. He returned to England in January 1916 and on 29 January 1917 was appointed lieutenant of the Tower of London.

He led a campaign in London for moral purity, calling for suppression of "suggestive or indecent" media.

=== French's memoirs ===
French, partly in response to criticism inspired by Smith-Dorrien, later wrote a partial and inaccurate account of the opening of the war in his book 1914, which attacked Smith-Dorrien. Smith-Dorrien, as a serving officer, was denied permission to reply in public.

French's official despatch after Le Cateau had praised Smith-Dorrien's "rare and unusual coolness, intrepidity and determination". In 1914 French wrote that this had been written before he knew the full facts, and that Smith-Dorrien had risked destruction of his corps and lost 14,000 men and 80 guns (actual losses of each were around half of this number). Smith-Dorrien, in a private written statement, called 1914 "mostly a work of fiction and a foolish one too".

== Family ==
On 3 September 1902 (on leave between being Adjutant General, India and taking command of 4th Division), he married Olive Crofton Schneider (1881–1951) at St Peter's, Eaton Square, London, in a ceremony performed by his brother Rev. Walter Smith-Dorrien.

Olive was the eldest daughter of Colonel John Henry Augustus Schneider and his wife, Mary Elizabeth (née Crofton) Schneider, of Oak Lea, Furness Abbey. Her brothers were Henry Crofton Schneider and Major Cyril Crofton Schneider. Olive's mother was the stepsister of Gen. Sir Arthur Power Palmer who died in 1904.

The Smith-Dorriens had three sons:

- Grenfell Horace Gerald Smith-Dorrien (born 1904) served in the army, reaching the rank of brigadier. He was killed by shellfire on 13 September 1944 during the Italian Campaign, while commanding the 169th (London) Infantry Brigade. His grave is in the Gradara War Cemetery, in the Commune of Gradara in the Province of Pesaro and Urbino.
- Peter Lockwood Smith-Dorrien (born 1907) was killed in the King David Hotel bombing on 22 July 1946.
- Bromley David Smith-Dorrien (1911–2001) He joined the Foresters in 1940. After the war, he worked to keep alive his father's reputation, designing a first-day cover commemorating the Battle of Le Cateau and helping his father's biographer A. J. Smithers. His grave is at Kennington Cemetery.

Horace and Olive Smith-Dorrien informally adopted Power Palmer's two daughters, Frances Gabrielle (b. 1902) and Celia de Courcy (b. ca. 1903), who were left homeless after their mother, Power Palmer's second wife, died in 1912.

Olive Smith-Dorrien was created a Dame Commander of the Order of the British Empire (DBE) in 1918.

== Later years and death ==
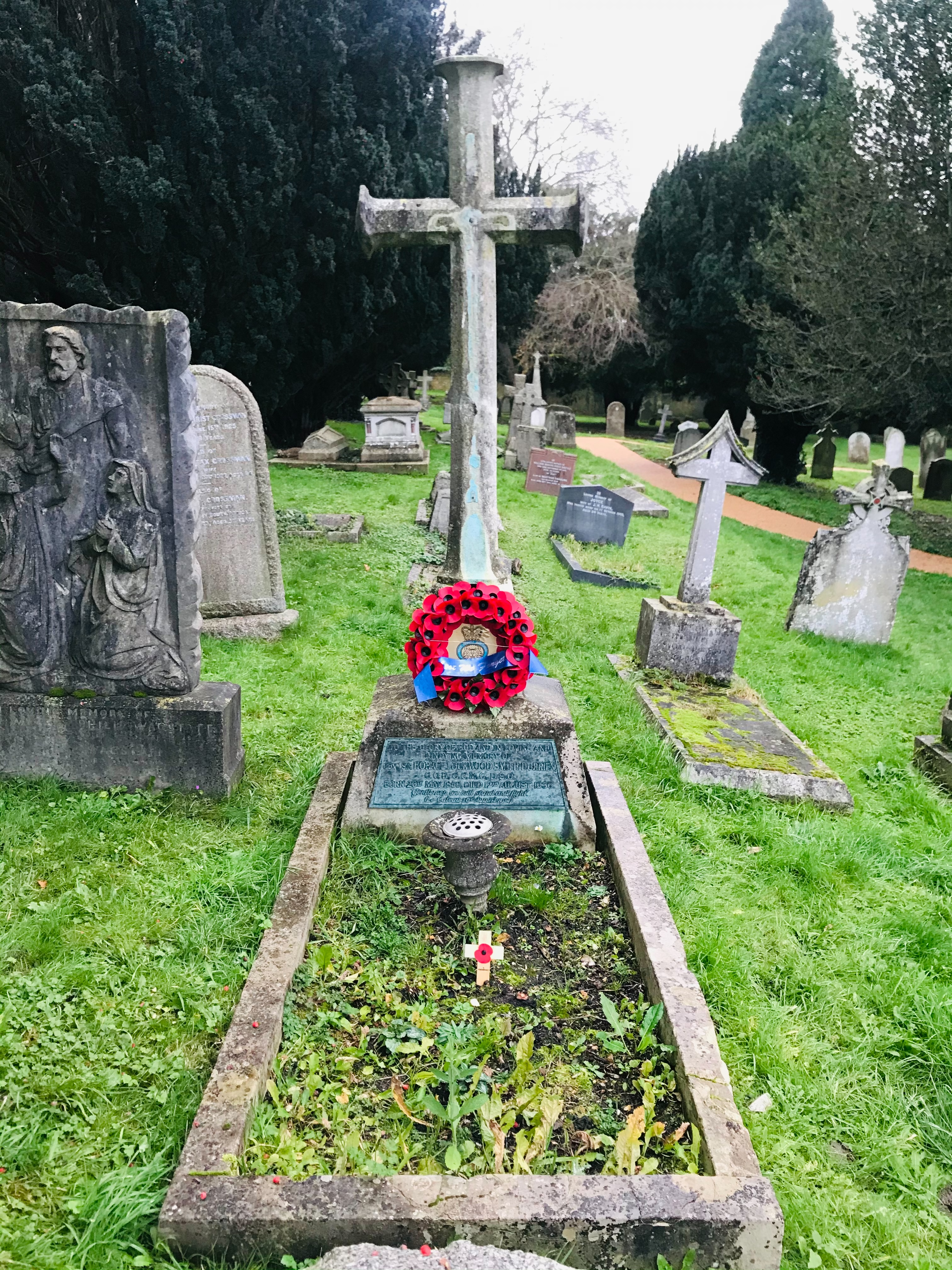
Horace Smith-Dorrien's grave in Berkhamsted

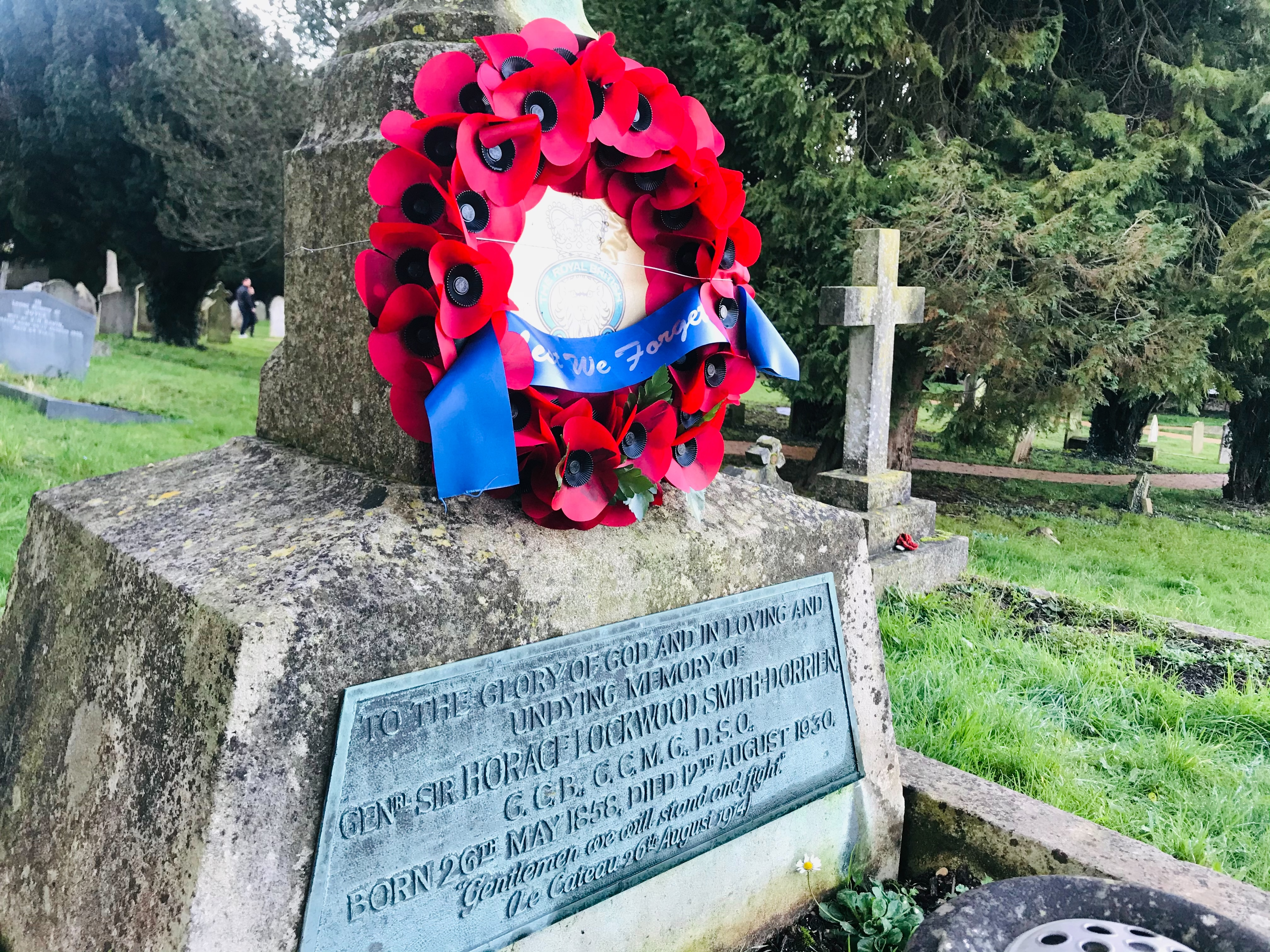
Close-up of the plate on Smith-Dorrien's gravestone

Smith-Dorrien's last position was as governor of Gibraltar from 9 July 1918 until 26 May 1923, where he introduced an element of democracy and closed some brothels. According to Wyndham Childs in the summer of 1918, Smith-Dorrien tried, and nearly succeeded, in uniting the Comrades of the Great War, the National Association of Discharged Sailors and Soldiers, and the National Federation of Discharged and Demobilized Sailors and Soldiers into one organisation. The merger later took place in 1921 to form the British Legion, under the influence of Field Marshal Haig.

He relinquished his assignment in September 1923 and retired, living in Portugal and finally in England. He devoted much of his time to the welfare and remembrance of Great War soldiers. He worked on his memoirs, which were published in 1925. As French was still alive at the time of writing, he still felt unable to rebut 1914. Despite his treatment by French, in 1925, he journeyed across Europe to act as a pallbearer at French's funeral, an act appreciated by French's son.

He played himself in the film The Battle of Mons, released in 1926. In June 1925, he unveiled the war memorial in Memorial Avenue, Worksop. On 4 August 1930, he unveiled the Pozières Memorial.

Smith-Dorrien died on 12 August 1930 following injuries sustained in a car accident at Chippenham, in Wiltshire; he was 72 years old. His body was buried at the Rectory Lane Cemetery of the Church of St Peter, Great Berkhamsted in Hertfordshire. His grave is marked by a tall stone cross, once adorned by a bronze sword of sacrifice which has since been stolen. The grave was restored in 2018, although the sword is still missing.

His wife Olive outlived him by more than twenty years and died on 15 September 1951 in the Chelsea area of London.

== Legacy ==
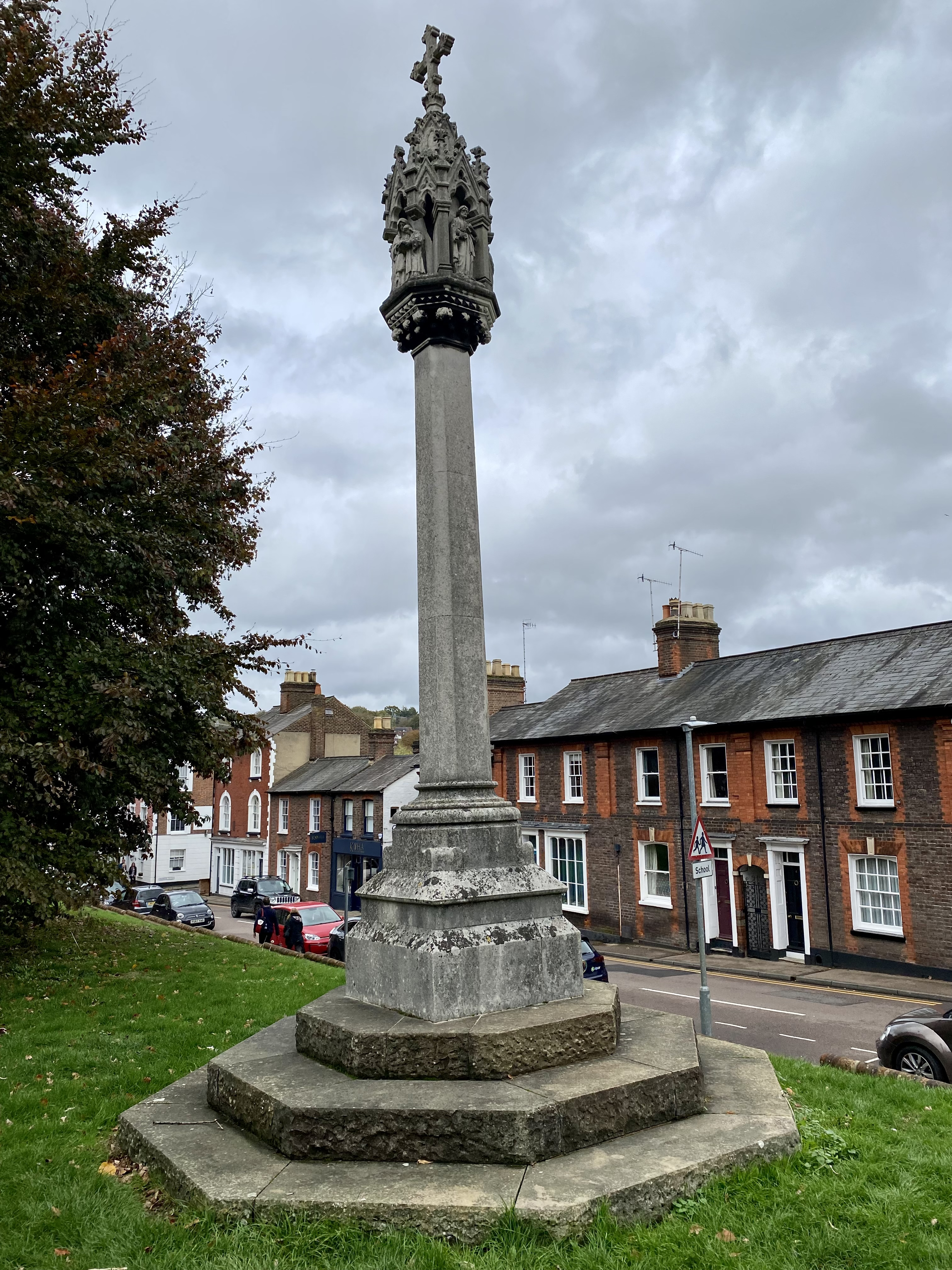
The Smith-Dorrien Monument in St Peter's Churchyard, Berkhamsted.

The following memorials have been established:

- Stall plate 14 in the Henry VII Chapel of Westminster Abbey (1913)
- In 1931, after his death, the Smith-Dorrien Memorial was added to the Sherwood Foresters Memorial in Crich, Derbyshire, which Smith-Dorrien himself had opened on 6 August 1923.

Several places and institutions around the world have been named after Horace Smith-Dorrien, including:

- Dorrien, a vineyard area in South Australia (1916)
- Mount Smith-Dorrien, Alberta, Canada (1918); the Smith-Dorrien Trail and Smith-Dorrien Creek, Alberta are also named after him.
- Smith-Dorrien Institute in Aldershot
- Smith Dorrien Road, Leicester
- Smith Dorrien Avenue, Smith Dorrien Bridge, and Smith Dorrien House, Gibraltar
- Smith Dorrien Street, Netherby, South Australia
- Smith-Dorrien Avenue, Esterhazy, Saskatchewan

John Betjeman, mentions Horace in Chapter III "Highgate" of his autobiographical blank-verse poem Summoned by Bells:

In late September, in the conker time,

When Poperinghe and Zillebeke and Mons
Boomed with five-nines, large sepia gravures
Of French, Smith-Dorrien and Haig were given

Gratis with each half-pound of Brooke Bond tea.

Horace also features in the poem "Canada to England" by Craven Langstroth Betts:

Lead out, lead out, Brave Mother, for the sake of sacked Louvain!
Give us our own Smith-Dorrien, yield us the van again!

Military offices
Preceded by Beauchamp Duff	Adjutant-General, India; 1901–1903	Succeeded by Beauchamp Duff
Preceded by Sir John French	GOC-in-C Aldershot Command; 1907–1912	Succeeded by Sir Douglas Haig
Preceded by Sir Charles Douglas	GOC-in-C Southern Command; 1912–1914	Succeeded by Sir William Campbell
Preceded by James Grierson	GOC II Corps; August 1914 – December 1914	Succeeded by Charles Fergusson
Preceded by New post	GOC-in-C British Second Army; 1914–1915	Succeeded by Sir Herbert Plumer
Government offices
Preceded by Sir Herbert Miles	Governor of Gibraltar; 1918–1923	Succeeded by Sir Charles Monro
