= George Simon Harcourt =

George Simon Harcourt (28 February 1807 – 24 October 1871) was a British politician.

The son of John Simon Harcourt of Ankerwycke, Harcourt was educated at Eton School and Christ Church, Oxford. In 1834, he served as High Sheriff of Buckinghamshire. He stood in the 1837 Buckinghamshire by-election, winning the seat for the Conservative Party, and he held the seat at the 1837 UK general election. In Parliament, he was considered to be on the liberal wing of the party, with a particular interest in agricultural matters. He stood down at the 1841 UK general election.

In 1834, Harcourt commissioned a large house, built in a pseudo-Norman style on Magna Carta Island, in the River Thames in Surrey. The island is a claimed site of the signing of Magna Carta in 1215 and within the house there is still a large inscribed stone that Harcourt installed to commemorate the signing. The house is now Grade II listed.

Parliament of the United Kingdom
Preceded by Richard Temple-Nugent-Brydges-Chandos-Grenville; William Young; James Backwell Praed	Member of Parliament for Buckinghamshire; 1837–1841; With: William Young; Richard Temple-Nugent-Brydges-Chandos-Grenville (1837–1839); Caledon Du Pré (1839–1841)	Succeeded by Caledon Du Pré; Charles Scott-Murray; William Young
Civic offices
Preceded by Charles Clowes	High Sheriff of Buckinghamshire; 1834	Succeeded by Gore Ouseley
