= Charles Scott-Murray =

British politician (1818–1882)

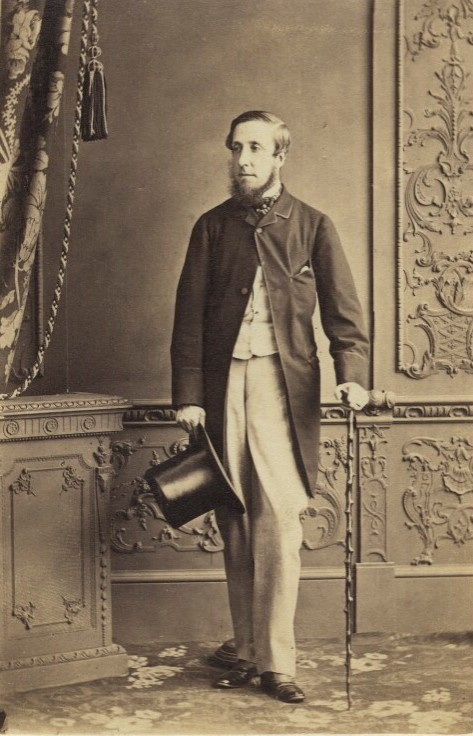
- Charles Robert Scott-Murray

Member of Parliament for Buckinghamshire
- In office 5 July 1841 – 21 February 1845 Serving with William FitzMaurice (1842–1845); Caledon Du Pré (1841–1845); William Young (1841–1842)
- Preceded by: George Simon Harcourt; William Young; Caledon Du Pré
- Succeeded by: Caledon Du Pré; William FitzMaurice; Christopher Tower

Personal details
- Born: 28 December 1818
- Died: 27 August 1882 (aged 63)
- Party: Conservative

Charles Robert Scott-Murray (28 December 1818 – 27 August 1882) was a British Conservative politician.

== Life ==
He was the son of Charles Scott Murray of Danesfield House, and his wife Augusta Eliza Nixon, widow of John Buller M.P., and was educated at Eton College and Christ Church, Oxford, where he matriculated in 1837 and graduated B.A. in 1841. On his father's death in 1837, he inherited Danesfield House and had it enlarged by Anthony Salvin. He was received into the Roman Catholic Church in 1844, in Rome, and became a patron of Augustus Pugin, paying for St Peter's Church, Marlow.

Scott-Murray was elected Conservative Member of Parliament for Buckinghamshire at the 1841 general election and held the seat until 1845 when he resigned by accepting the office of Steward of the Manor of Hempholme.

One of Scott-Murray's chaplains was Thomas John Capel. The association played a part in the reception as a Catholic of John Crichton-Stuart, 3rd Marquess of Bute.

== Family ==
Scott-Murray married on 17 September 1846 Amelia Charlotte Fraser, eldest daughter of Thomas Fraser, 12th Lord Lovat.

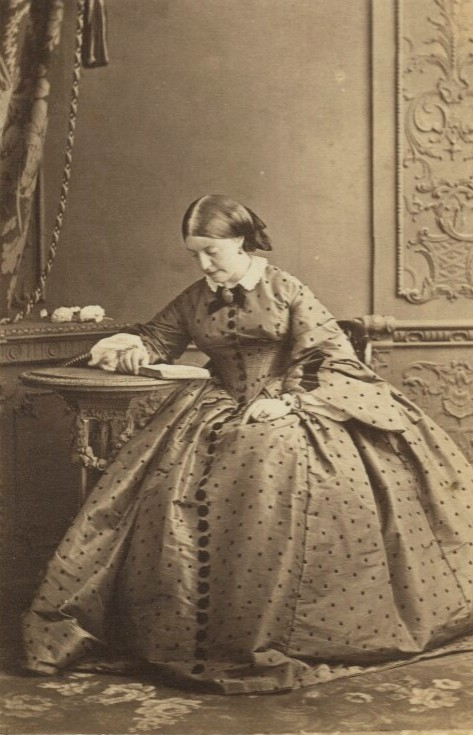
Amelia Scott-Murray, 1863 photograph

Their sons included Charles Aloysius Scott-Murray (1847–1909), High Sheriff of Buckinghamshire in 1890, Augustin John Alphonse Scott-Murray (1848–1871), and Basil Henry Scott-Murray (born 1858), an officer of the Scots Guards. Scott-Murray was one of the early supporters of The Oratory School, to which he sent his two elder sons who had been educated at home; but quite soon expressed reservations about it. Daughters were Mildred Frances, married in 1871 Ralph Henry Christopher Nevile; Laura Amelia Margaret; and Mary Elizabeth Charlotte.

Parliament of the United Kingdom
Preceded by George Simon Harcourt; William Young; Caledon Du Pré	Member of Parliament for Buckinghamshire; 1841–1845; With: William FitzMaurice (1842–1845); Caledon Du Pré (1841–1845); William Young (1841–1842)	Succeeded by Caledon Du Pré; William FitzMaurice; Christopher Tower
