= Nathaniel Lambert =

Nathaniel Grace Lambert JP DL (1811 – 9 December 1882) was an English mine-owner and Liberal Party politician who sat in the House of Commons from 1868 to 1880.

Lambert was the son of Richard Lambert of Newcastle upon Tyne and his wife Achsah Grace, daughter of Nathaniel Grace. He was educated privately and became a mine-owner. He was captain-commandant of the Taplow Yeomanry Lancers and a J.P. and deputy lieutenant for Buckinghamshire. In 1865 he was High Sheriff of Buckinghamshire.

At the 1868 general election Lambert was elected as a Member of Parliament (MP) for Buckinghamshire. He held the seat until 1880.

Lambert died at the age of 71.

Lambert married Mary Ann Richards, daughter of Thomas Wright Richards of Rushden, Northamptonshire, in 1843.

Their youngest daughter, Christina, married Lord John Hay in 1876.

Parliament of the United Kingdom
Preceded by Robert Harvey; Benjamin Disraeli; Caledon Du Pré	Member of Parliament for Buckinghamshire; 1868–1880; With: Caledon Du Pré to 1874; Benjamin Disraeli to 1876; Sir Robert Harvey, Bt from 1874; Thomas Fremantle from 1876	Succeeded by Rupert Carington; Sir Robert Harvey, Bt; Thomas Fremantle
