= William FitzMaurice (Buckinghamshire MP) =

British Conservative Party politician

William Edward FitzMaurice (21 March 1805 – 18 June 1889) was a British Conservative Party politician.

== Background ==
FitzMaurice was the son of John FitzMaurice, Viscount Kirkwall, (son of the Hon. Thomas FitzMaurice who was the younger son of John Petty, 1st Earl of Shelburne and younger brother of Prime Minister William Petty, 1st Marquess of Lansdowne) and his wife Mary FitzMaurice, 4th Countess of Orkney, daughter of Murrough O'Brien, 1st Marquess of Thomond and Mary O'Brien, 3rd Countess of Orkney. His mother was the Hon. Anna Maria, daughter of John Blaquiere, 1st Baron de Blaquiere, while Thomas FitzMaurice, 5th Earl of Orkney was his elder brother.

== Political career ==
FitzMaurice was elected as a Member of Parliament (MP) for Buckinghamshire at an unopposed by-election in July 1842. He held the seat until the 1847 general election, when he did not stand for re-election.

== Family ==
FitzMaurice was twice married. He married firstly Hester, daughter of Henry Harford, in 1837. After her death in August 1859 he married secondly Anne Louisa, daughter of John Hatton, in 1870. He died in June 1889, aged 84.

Parliament of the United Kingdom
Preceded by Sir William Young; Caledon du Pré; Charles Scott-Murray	Member of Parliament for Buckinghamshire; 1842–1847; With: Caledon du Pré 1824–1847; Charles Scott-Murray 1842–1845; Christopher Tower 1845–1847	Succeeded by Caledon du Pré; Charles Cavendish; Benjamin Disraeli
