= Sir Robert Harvey, 1st Baronet of Langley Park =

English politician

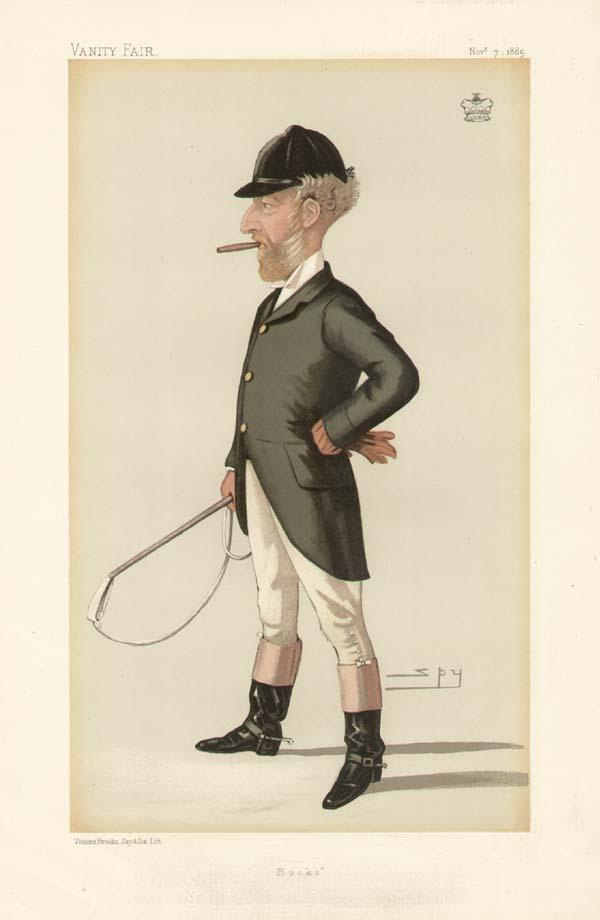
Caricature by Spy published in Vanity Fair in 1885.

Sir Robert Bateson Harvey, 1st Baronet, of Langley Park (17 November 1825 – March 1887), was an English Conservative Party politician who sat in the House of Commons in two periods between 1863 and 1885.

Harvey was the son of Robert Harvey of Langley Park, Sheriff of Buckinghamshire, and his wife Jane Jemima Collins, daughter of John Raw Collins of Hatch Court, Somerset. His father was an illegitimate son of Sir Robert Bateson-Harvey, 1st Bt. (died 1825). Harvey was educated at Eton College and Christ Church, Oxford. He was a captain in the 5th Buckinghamshire Rifle Volunteers and then in the Royal Buckinghamshire Yeoman Cavalry. He was a J.P. and Deputy Lieutenant for Buckinghamshire. The Langley Park estate in Buckinghamshire was bought by his grandfather in 1788, and passed down to him.

In 1863 Harvey was elected Member of Parliament (MP) for Buckinghamshire and held the seat until 1868. In 1868 he was created a baronet of Langley Park. He was re-elected MP for Buckinghamshire in 1874 and held the seat until 1885.

Harvey married firstly in 1855 Diana Jane Creyke, daughter of Ven. Stephen Creyke, Archdeacon of York, and secondly in 1874 Magdalene Breadalbane Anderson, daughter of Sir John Pringle, 5th Baronet and widow of Alexander Anderson of New South Wales.

Parliament of the United Kingdom
Preceded by Caledon Du Pré; William Cavendish; Benjamin Disraeli	Member of Parliament for Buckinghamshire; 1863 – 1868; With: Caledon Du Pré; Benjamin Disraeli	Succeeded by Caledon Du Pré; Benjamin Disraeli; Nathaniel Grace Lambert
Preceded by Caledon Du Pré; Nathaniel Grace Lambert; Benjamin Disraeli	Member of Parliament for Buckinghamshire; 1874 – 1885; With: Benjamin Disraeli to 1876; Nathaniel Grace Lambert to 1880; Hon. Thomas Fremantle 1876–85; Rupert Carington 1880–85	Constituency divided
Baronetage of the United Kingdom
New creation	Baronet (of Langley Park); 1868–1887	Succeeded by Robert Harvey
