= Richard Temple-Nugent-Brydges-Chandos-Grenville, 2nd Duke of Buckingham and Chandos =

British politician and military officer (1797–1861)

His Grace The Duke of Buckingham and Chandos KG GCH PC FSA
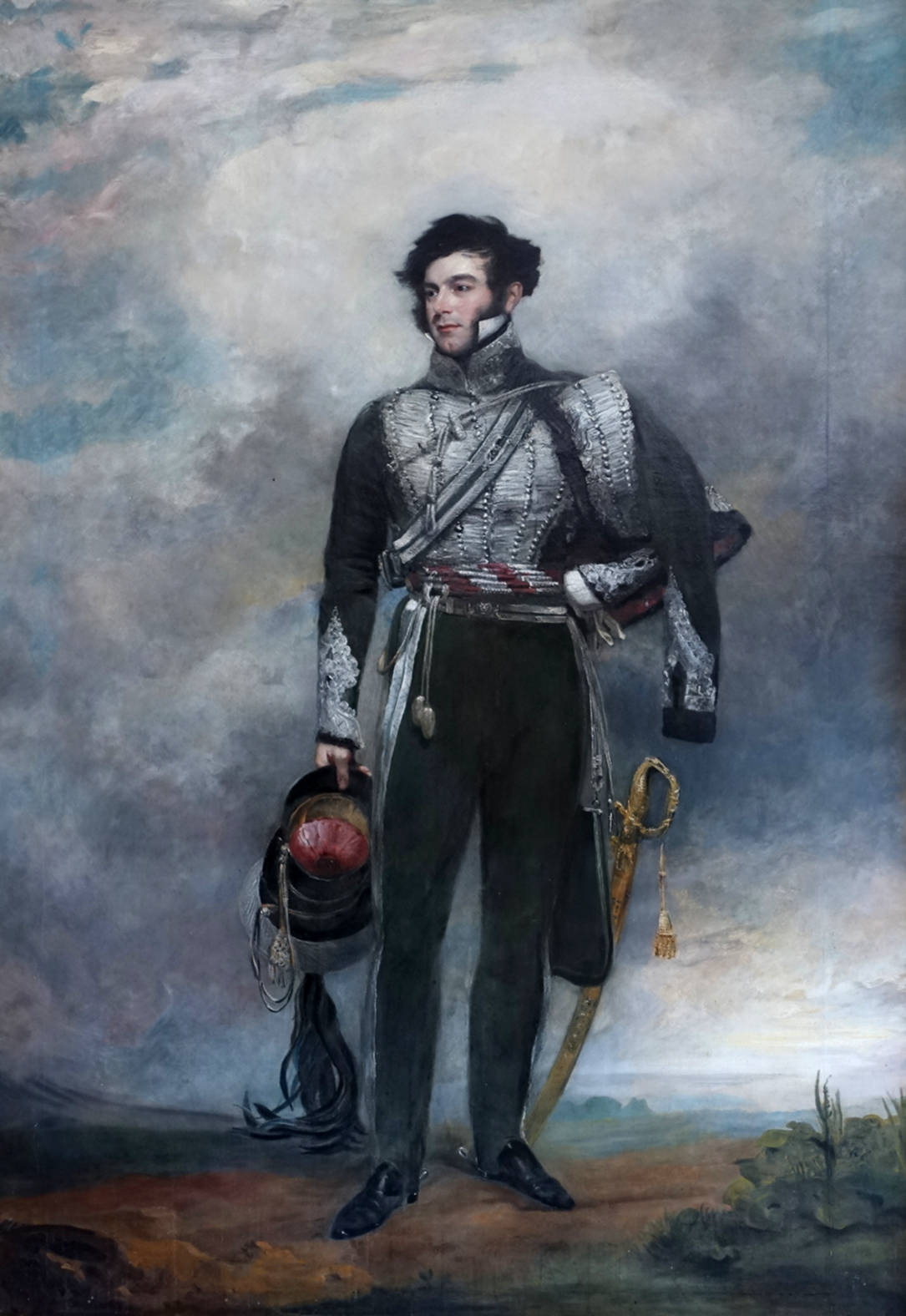
- Portrait by John Jackson, 1830

Lord Privy Seal
- In office 3 September 1841 – 2 February 1842
- Monarch: Queen Victoria
- Prime Minister: Sir Robert Peel
- Preceded by: The Earl of Clarendon
- Succeeded by: The Duke of Buccleuch

Member of the House of Lords
- Lord Temporal
- Hereditary peerage 17 January 1839 – 29 July 1861

Member of the House of Commons for Buckinghamshire
- In office 1818 – 17 January 1839
- Succeeded by: Caledon Du Pré

Personal details
- Born: 11 February 1797 Stowe House, Buckinghamshire, Great Britain
- Died: 29 July 1861 (aged 64) Great Western Hotel, Paddington, United Kingdom
- Party: Tory
- Spouse: Lady Mary Campbell (m. 1819; div. 1850)
- Children: Lady Anna Eliza Mary Gore-Langton; Richard Temple-Nugent-Brydges-Chandos-Grenville, 3rd Duke of Buckingham and Chandos
- Parents: Richard Temple-Grenville, 1st Duke of Buckingham and Chandos; Anne Elizabeth Temple-Nugent-Brydges-Chandos-Grenville, Duchess of Buckingham
- Education: Oriel College, Oxford

Military service
- Allegiance: United Kingdom
- Branch/service: Yeomanry Cavalry
- Years of service: 1813–1861
- Rank: Colonel
- Commands: Buckinghamshire Yeomanry
- Battles/wars: Napoleonic Wars

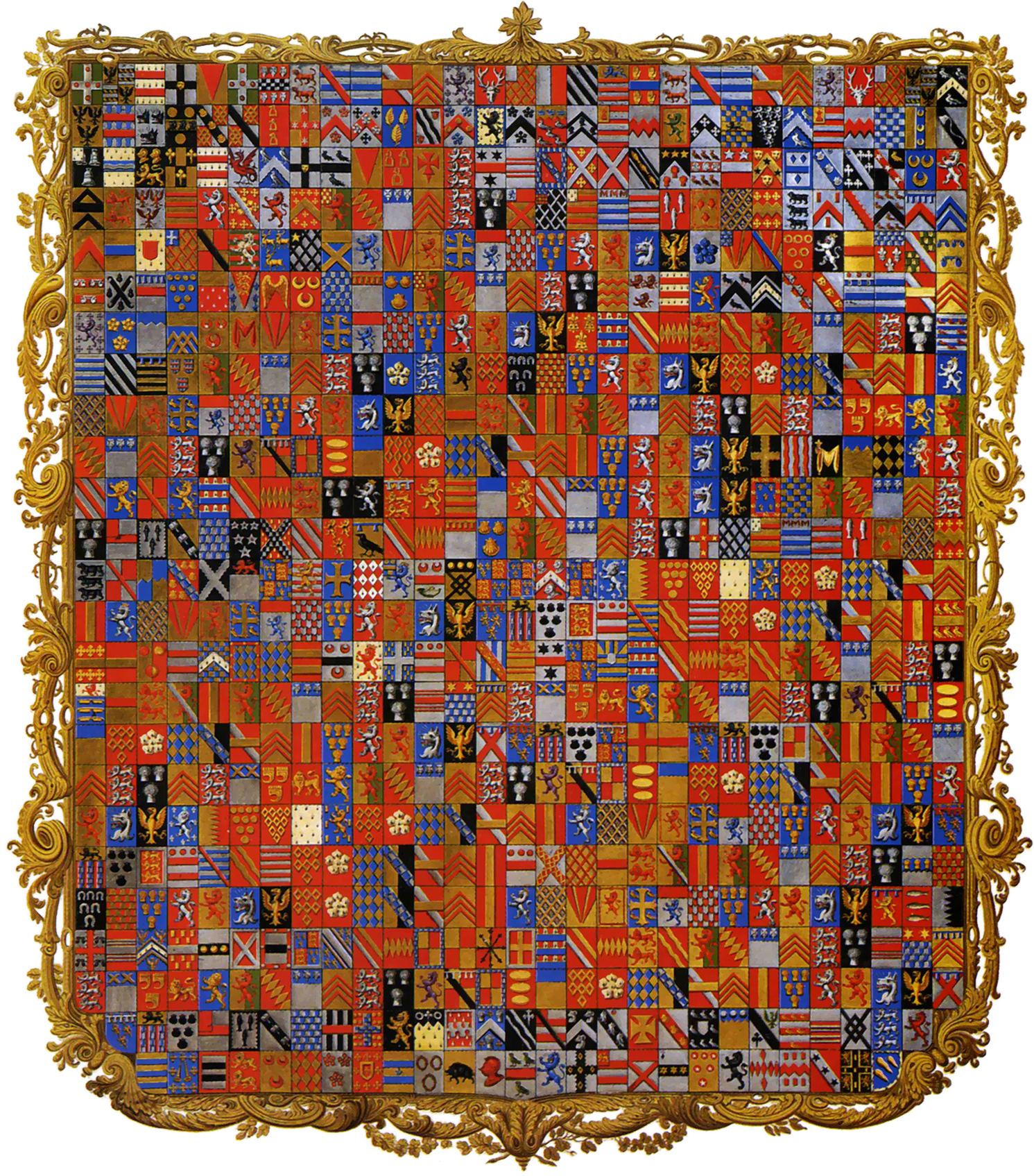
The Grenville Armorial produced between 1822 and 1839 for Richard Temple-Grenville, Marquess of Chandos, the son of the 1st Duke of Buckingham and Chandos. The centrepiece of the Gothic Library at Stowe House, it shows 719 quarterings of the family.

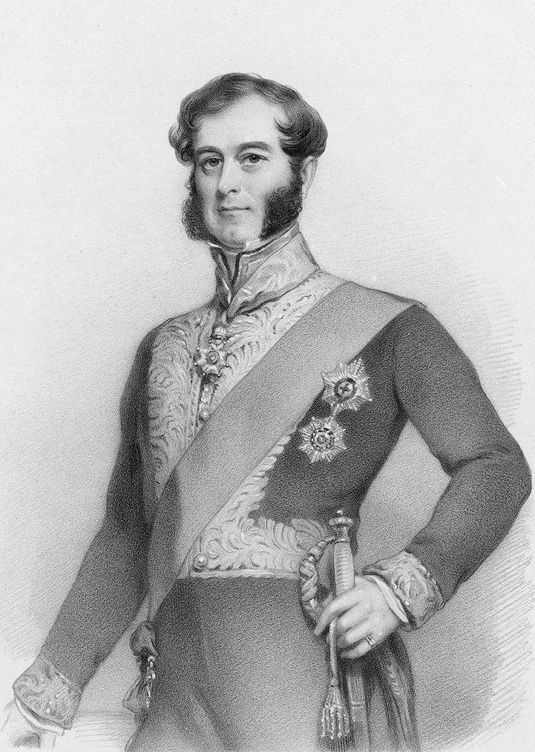

Colonel Richard Plantagenet Temple-Nugent-Brydges-Chandos-Grenville, 2nd Duke of Buckingham and Chandos (11 February 1797 – 29 July 1861), styled Viscount Cobham from birth until 1813, Earl Temple between 1813 and 1822 and Marquess of Chandos between 1822 and 1839, was a British Tory politician and military officer. He served as Lord Privy Seal between 1841 and 1842. Two events in his life were remarkable, given the era he lived in and the position he held in society as a duke: firstly, despite the great wealth to which he was born, he declared bankruptcy with debts of over a million pounds in 1847; secondly, he obtained a divorce at a time when it required an Act of Parliament.

== Background and education ==
Born at Stowe, Buckinghamshire, the Duke of Buckingham and Chandos was the son of the Richard Nugent-Temple-Grenville, Earl Temple (later created the Duke of Buckingham and Chandos) and Lady Anne Brydges, the only surviving child of the 3rd Duke of Chandos. In addition to being the Duchess of Buckingham and Chandos, Lady Anne was suo jure Lady Kinloss. In 1799, Richard Temple-Nugent-Grenville changed the already triple-barrelled family name to Temple-Nugent-Brydges-Chandos-Grenville by royal licence to reflect his wife's family.

The second Duke was a paternal grandson of the 1st Marquess of Buckingham and a great-grandson of Prime Minister George Grenville. He was educated at Eton and Oriel College, Oxford.

== Political and military career ==
Buckingham sat as Member of Parliament for Buckinghamshire between 1818 and 1839, when he succeeded his father in the dukedom and entered the House of Lords. Two years later, in September 1841, he was sworn of the Privy Council and appointed Lord Privy Seal by Sir Robert Peel, a post he held only until February 1842. He was appointed a Knight Grand Cross of the Royal Hanoverian Order in 1835, elected a Fellow of the Society of Antiquaries in 1840 and made a Knight of the Garter in 1842. Buckingham was chairman of the West India Committee until resigning in 1833.

On 15 June 1813 Buckingham was commissioned into the British Volunteer Corps' 2nd (Middle) Regiment of Buckinghamshire Cavalry at the rank of captain. Though the 1st and 3rd Regiments of Buckinghamshire Cavalry were disbanded in 1828 after the War Office withdrew funding for the Yeomanry Cavalry, the 2nd Regiment continued to exist due to being privately funded by Buckingham. On 22 September 1839 he became colonel of the regiment, which had been renamed the 2nd Buckinghamshire Yeomanry Cavalry in 1830. Buckingham continued to be colonel of the regiment until his death.

== Financial affairs ==
In 1847, eight years after succeeding his father as Duke of Buckingham and Chandos, the second Duke was declared bankrupt, with debts over a million pounds (£89.7 million as of 2025). This occasioned the sale of his Keynsham estate in Somerset in 1841, Avington Park in 1847 and ultimately the auction sale of the contents of the main family seat at Stowe House in August–September 1848, one of the handful of most prominent English country house contents auctions of the 19th century. The financial ruin of so prominent a member of the aristocracy, who had inherited an income of more than £70,000, a vast fortune at the time, became a national sensation.

== Personal life ==
In 1819, Buckingham married Lady Mary Campbell, daughter of Lieutenant-General John Campbell, 4th Earl of Breadalbane (later created Marquess of Breadalbane). They had one son, Richard, 3rd Duke of Buckingham and Chandos, and one daughter, Lady Anna, but were divorced in 1850 after Buckingham had lost his inheritance. At that time, divorce required an Act of Parliament. Anna went to campaign for women's rights.

Buckingham died at the Great Western Hotel, Paddington, London, in July 1861, aged 64, and was succeeded in the dukedom by his only son. His former wife died less than a year later in June 1862, aged 66.

== Bibliography ==
- Spring, David & Spring, Eileen (1956). "The Fall of the Grenvilles, 1844–1848". Huntington Library Quarterly. 19 (2): 165–190. doi:10.2307/3816224. JSTOR 3816224.

Parliament of the United Kingdom
Preceded by William Selby Lowndes; Thomas Grenville	Member of Parliament for Buckinghamshire; 1818–1839; With: William Selby Lowndes 1818–1820; Robert Smith 1820–1831; John Smith 1831–1835; Sir George Dashwood, Bt 1832–1835; Sir William Young 1835–1839; George Simon Harcourt 1835–1839	Succeeded by Sir William Young; George Simon Harcourt; Caledon Du Pré
Political offices
Preceded by The Earl of Clarendon	Lord Privy Seal; 1841–1842	Succeeded by The Duke of Buccleuch
Peerage of the United Kingdom
Preceded by Richard Temple-Grenville	Duke of Buckingham and Chandos; 1839–1861	Succeeded by Richard Temple-Grenville
Peerage of Scotland
Preceded by Anne Temple-Nugent-Brydges-Chandos-Grenville	Lord Kinloss; 1836–1861	Succeeded by Richard Temple-Grenville
