= Robert Smith-Dorrien =

British soldier and churchwarden (1814–1879)

Lt. Col. Robert Smith-Dorrien JP
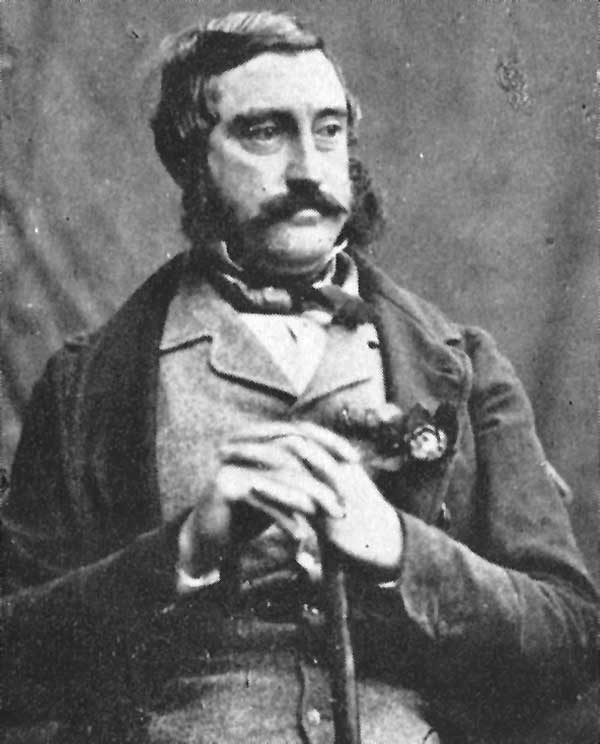
- Born: Robert Algernon Smith; 2 October 1814
- Died: 8 October 1879 (aged 65)
- Spouse: Mary Anne Drever (married 1845)
- Children: 15 (including Thomas Smith-Dorrien and Horace Smith-Dorrien)
- Parents: James Smith (father); Mary Isabella Pechell (mother)
- Relatives: Augustus Smith (brother)

Lieutenant Colonel Robert Algernon Smith-Dorrien JP (né Robert Algernon Smith; 2 October 1814 – 8 October 1879) was a British churchwarden and soldier.

== Biography ==
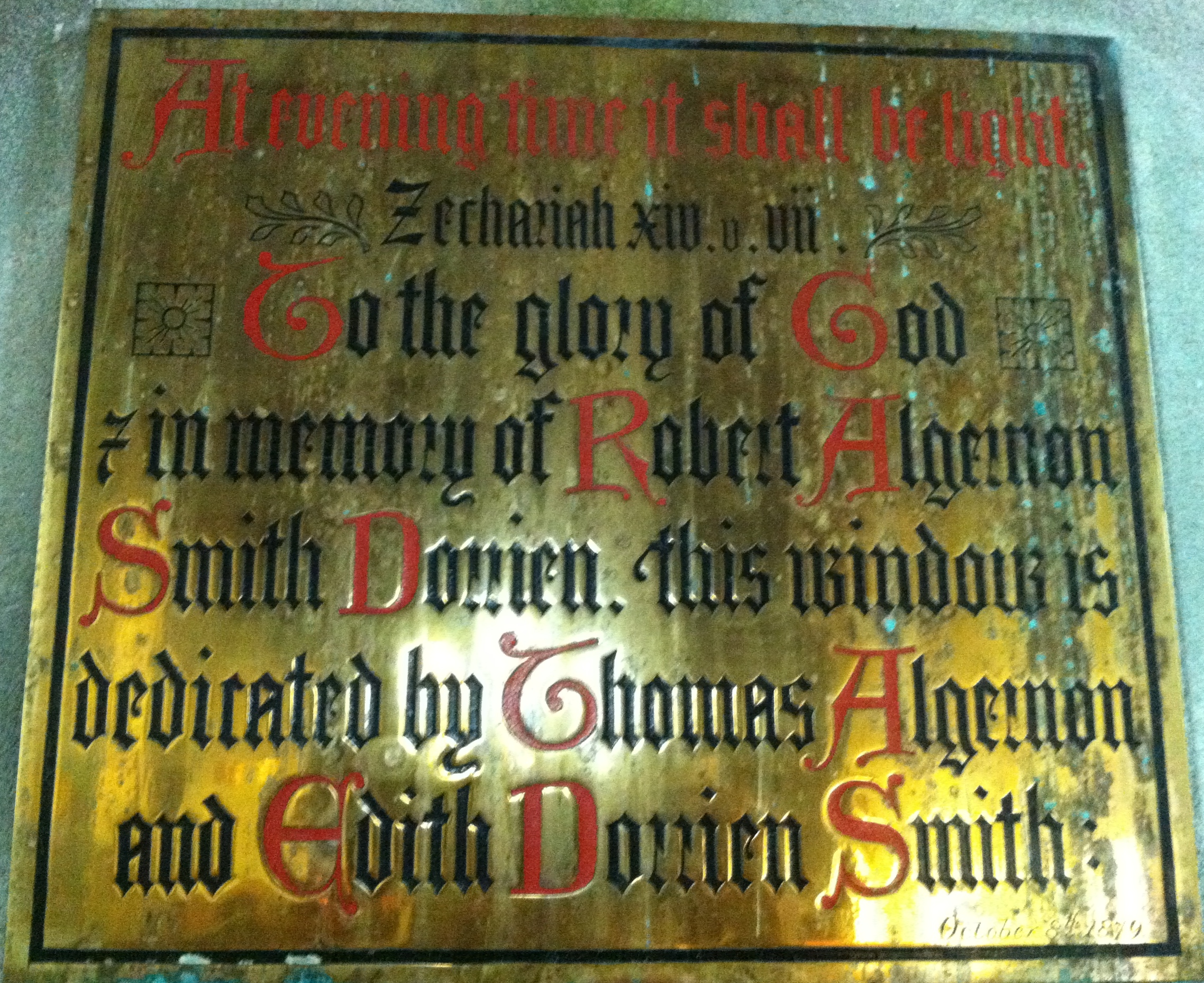
The plaque at St Peter's Church commemorating Robert Smith-Dorrien

Robert Smith was born on 2 October 1814 to James Smith and Mary Isabella Pechell. He married Mary Anne Drever, a member of the Dorrien family, in 1845. He adopted his wife's maiden name and changed his surname by Royal Licence to Smith-Dorrien. Together they had 15 children, including Thomas Smith-Dorrien and Horace Smith-Dorrien.

He served as a Justice of the Peace. He was a lieutenant colonel, serving in the Hertfordshire Militia and also a captain in both the 3rd Light Dragoons and the 16th Lancers.

Smith-Dorrien was heavily involved in the restoration of the now Grade II* listed St Peter's Church in Berkhamsted, Hertfordshire, serving as the Churchwarden from 1868 until his death on 8 October 1879. Due to his work for the church building, a stained glass window by Charles Eamer Kempe was installed and dedicated in his honour, along with a plaque.

== Family ==
Smith-Dorrien's elder brother was Augustus Smith, Lord Proprietor of the Isles of Scilly from 1834 to 1872. Augustus Smith was succeeded as Lord Proprietor by Robert Smith-Dorrien's eldest son, Thomas Algernon Smith-Dorrien.
