= Christopher Tower (MP, died 1884) =

English landowner and politician

Christopher Theron Tower (2 May 1804 – 3 March 1884) was an English landowner and politician.

He was born at Gadebridge, the eldest son of Christopher Thomas Tower of Weald Hall, Essex, and was educated at Harrow School and Oriel College, Oxford. From 1826 to 1836 he served with the 7th Hussars, reaching the rank of captain. In 1836 he married Lady Sophia, eldest daughter of John Cust, 1st Earl Brownlow. He lived at Huntsmoor Park, Buckinghamshire, and in a by-election in 1845 he was elected to Parliament for the county, without a contest. He was appointed a deputy lieutenant for Buckinghamshire in 1846. A Conservative, in the debate on the repeal of the Corn Laws he voted in favour of agricultural protection, and was a member of the Carlton Club and Boodle's. He did not stand in the general election of 1847.
