= Albert Bosanquet =

British judge

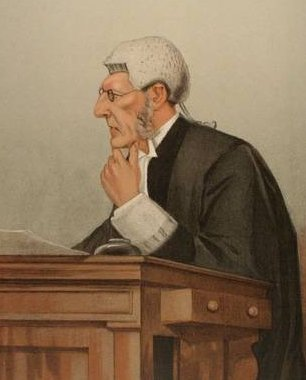
Sir Frederick Bosanquet as Common Serjeant. Caricature by 'Spy' from Vanity Fair (1901)

Sir Frederick Albert Bosanquet, KC, JP (8 February 1837 – 2 November 1923) was a British judge who was Common Serjeant of London, the second most senior permanent judge of the Central Criminal Court after the Recorder of London.

== Biography ==
Frederick 'Bosey' Bosanquet was one of ten surviving children born to Samuel Richard Bosanquet, DL, JP (1800–1882), of Dingestow Court, Monmouthshire, the grandson of Samuel Bosanquet (1744–1806), Governor of the Bank of England from 1791 to 1793. The family were of Huguenot origin, the Bosanquets having fled to England from Lunel, Montpellier in France in 1685 following the revocation of the Edict of Nantes. His mother was Emily Courthope (died 1869).

Bosanquet was educated at Windlesham House, Eton and King's College, Cambridge, of which he was formerly a Fellow (BA 1860, MA 1863), and was called to the Bar at the Inner Temple in 1863. With George N. Darby he co-authored A Practical Treatise on the Statutes of Limitations in England and Ireland, his only published work, written in 1867.

He was appointed a QC in 1882, and elected a Bencher in 1889. He was a Magistrate for Monmouthshire and Sussex, and was Chairman of the East Sussex Quarter Sessions.

He was the Recorder for Worcester from 1879 to 1891, and Recorder for Wolverhampton in 1891 and 1900. In March 1900 he was appointed Common Serjeant of London, an ancient office first recorded in 1291 with the appointment of Thomas Juvenal, and the second most senior judicial position at the Old Bailey after the Recorder of London. Bosanquet was the Chairman of the Incorporated Council of Law Reporting from 1907 to 1919.

As a barrister, Bosanquet was based in chambers at 3 Paper Buildings, Temple from 1892. He was knighted in 1907.

On his retirement as Common Serjeant in November 1919 he was succeeded by Henry Fielding Dickens KC.

== Personal life ==
On 22 August 1871 Bosanquet married Albinia Mary Curtis-Hayward, the daughter of John Curtis-Hayward, and with whom he had four children. After her death, he married on 12 August 1885 Philippa Frances, the daughter of William Bence-Jones, with whom he had a son, and other children.

His son from his second marriage, Captain William Sidney Bence Bosanquet DSO (1893–1966), of the Coldstream Guards, married Esther Cleveland, the daughter of Grover Cleveland, a former President of the United States, on 14 March 1918 in Westminster Abbey. One of their two children was the philosopher Philippa Foot.
