= John Duffy and David Mulcahy =

Two British serial rapists and killers

- Born: John Francis Duffy (1958); David Mulcahy (1959); England
- Other names: The Railway Killers; The Railway Rapists
- Spouses: Margaret Duffy née Byrne, Sandra Mulcahy née Carr
- Convictions: Duffy: 2 murder; 4 rape Mulcahy: 3 murder; 7 rape
- Penalty: Life imprisonment (both Duffy and Mulcahy)

Details
- Span of crimes: 1982 – 18 May 1986
- Country: England
- Date apprehended: 7 November 1986 (Duffy); 6 February 1999 (Mulcahy)

John Francis Duffy (born 1958) and David Mulcahy (born 1959) are two British serial rapists and serial killers who together attacked numerous women and children at railway stations in southern England during the 1980s.

Their crimes are often referred to as "the railway murders", and they are often referred to as the "railway rapists" or the "railway killers"; Duffy, once identified, was referred to in the press as the "railway murderer" or "laser eyes".

Duffy was convicted of two murders and four rapes, although he was acquitted of a further rape and killing. He was given a minimum tariff of 30 years by the judge, later extended to a whole life tariff by the Home Secretary. Mulcahy was convicted of three counts of murder and seven counts of rape and was given three life sentences, with a 30-year recommendation, and 24 years' imprisonment for each full rape offence. Duffy was later sentenced to 12 years' imprisonment for each of seven full rape offences he had confessed to (although he was already serving a full life sentence).

== The attacks ==
Duffy and Mulcahy were friends since their education at Haverstock School in North London. Whilst in school they were once excluded after being found laughing and covered in blood, after bludgeoning a hedgehog.

In 1982, a woman was raped by two men near Hampstead Heath railway station. Eighteen more women were attacked over the next year, mostly late at night in dark, quiet places often near railway stations in and around North London, especially Hampstead, Barnet and other places. Further attacks occurred during 1984, and then three women were raped on the same night in 1985, in Hendon.

The Metropolitan Police in west London initiated an urgent investigation, named "Operation Hart", to apprehend the perpetrators. The women described their attackers as a short ginger-haired man and a larger man. DNA technology was not then available, but some suspects could be eliminated by blood grouping: one attacker, believed to be the ginger-haired man, was an "'A' secretor with a certain PGM factor of his blood". Unlike DNA, many people share the same blood grouping, so this evidence could eliminate suspects but not identify the offenders.

On the evening of 29 December 1985, Alison Day, aged 19, was on her way to meet her boyfriend at his place of employment at a desolate trading estate close to Hackney Wick station. Duffy and Mulcahy had been driving around to several railway stations and ended up at Hackney Wick, where they saw Day exit a train. After she stopped at a telephone box, it is believed she took a wrong turn, heading down to the canal and into the path of Duffy and Mulcahy. Duffy then threatened her with a knife and both men sexually assaulted her. The two men then forced her to walk across live railway lines to the parapet of a bridge. Day fell from the bridge into the canal, but was able to swim to the bank where Duffy and Mulcahy pulled her from the water and then to wasteland where she was strangled to death with her blouse. Her body was sunk in the River Lea using discarded cobbles (granite setts) placed into her coat pockets. The Metropolitan Police in east London set up a further, separate investigation, Operation Lea.

Police further stepped up their search for the attacker, who had been nicknamed by the press the "Railway Rapist". With the murder of Day, this changed to the "Railway Killer", a tag reinforced by the rape and murder of 15-year-old Dutch schoolgirl Maartje Tamboezer in West Horsley in Surrey on the afternoon of 17 April 1986, after she was knocked from her bicycle with a wire that had been tied between two trees. As well as suffering rape and strangulation, Tamboezer had been repeatedly struck on the head with a rock and her body was set on fire.

Surrey Police set up Operation Bluebell. Meanwhile, the Day murder inquiry was taken over by Detective Superintendent Charles Farquhar (a highly experienced east London murder investigator) and he linked that murder with the previous railway rapes. He then drew a link with the murder of Tamboezer when he spotted that a belt and twig in a crime scene photo were the parts of a tourniquet ligature. A month later, on 18 May 1986, Anne Lock, a 29-year-old secretary at London Weekend Television, was abducted and murdered after she got off a train at Brookmans Park railway station, Hertfordshire. This heralded the first multi-police-force murder inquiry (Operation Trinity) since the badly executed Yorkshire Ripper inquiry. It was the first such investigation to utilize basic computers and an early version of HOLMES (Home Office Large Major Enquiry System).

== Investigation ==
Duffy, a martial arts exponent and former railway carpenter, was identified by Detective Superintendent John Hurst as a suspect. He was known to police as he had been charged with the rape of his estranged wife. He is known to have believed that rape was a "natural male instinct". A rare type of string called "somyarn" was found in his parents' house. This linked him to the second murder victim. His experience with traditional bow saws linked him to the unusual method of strangulation using a self-fashioned tourniquet, and his knowledge of the railway system was part of his former job. David Mulcahy was also questioned, owing to his close friendship with Duffy, but victims were still traumatized and unable to pick him out of an identity parade. Mulcahy was released for lack of evidence.

To help their inquiries, the police brought in a psychologist from the University of Surrey, David Canter, who was working in the field of geographical psychology at the time. There had been no previous use in Britain of "psychological offender profiling" as it was known, but something fresh was required as two women and a child had been murdered and numerous others raped, with little progress being made. Canter examined the details of each crime and built up a profile of the attacker's personality, habits and traits. While this continued, another attack took place, when a 14-year-old girl was raped in a park. This inquiry led Canter to set up investigative psychology.

As well as working together with Mulcahy, Duffy had started to rape alone; he was arrested on 26 November 1986 while following a woman in a secluded park. Items linking him to the Tamboezer murder were discovered, and rape victims identified him. There was evidence to charge him with the three murders and some rapes. He was questioned about the crimes, and the next day he was charged on all counts. Police knew that he had not committed the offences alone, but Duffy was not forthcoming about his accomplice. Mulcahy was arrested as a likely suspect, but there was not sufficient evidence to charge him.

== Duffy ==
=== Trial and conviction ===
Duffy went on trial in February 1988 and was convicted of two murders and four rapes, although he was acquitted of raping and killing Anne Lock (Lock's body had not been found until weeks after her murder, meaning forensic evidence could not be found on her body). He was given a minimum tariff of 30 years by the judge, later extended to a whole life tariff by the Home Secretary. Duffy chose not to appeal against his sentence, later claiming that he regretted his crimes and considered the sentence justified.

Following the trial, much was made of the psychological profile constructed by Canter, as Duffy fitted 13 of the 17 observations he had predicted regarding the attacker's lifestyle and habits. Such profiling became commonplace in policing thereafter.

=== Duffy interviews ===
Following his conviction, Duffy revealed to a forensic psychologist what the police knew already: that he had not attacked the women alone. However, he did not reveal any more at the time.

A junior police officer at the time of the investigation and 1988 trial was interested in the case and had risen by March 1995 to a position where he could commence or progress an investigation; he visited John Duffy, who agreed to be interviewed, but said it would take a very long time. A series of visits followed, and Duffy eventually requested assistance from the prison psychological service. In late 1997 a new psychologist started work at the prison. Bolland told her that real progress could be made if Duffy received counselling; this was arranged, and in June 1998 he agreed to start making full, proper, detailed admissions to the police. Interviews in the prison were difficult, so Duffy was secretly taken to a remote Hertfordshire police station for a week. There were complications, such as the football World Cup being on; Duffy asked for the interviews to be scheduled around the games, which Bolland, also a football fan, was happy with.

The interviews were carried out under police caution, although Duffy was not in legal jeopardy, and taped. He confessed to a number of rapes but said he could remember no more. Further possible cases were put to him from police archives to jog his memory, and he remembered further cases. He was very clear that they were committed with his friend David Mulcahy.

Duffy ultimately admitted all his offences, including the three murders with Mulcahy. He also explained in detail what had happened to Anne Lock. Bolland wrote that Duffy's confessions "gave a chilling insight into the serial killer/rapist's mind". Duffy told Bolland that a song by Michael Jackson called Thriller had played a part in the offences; the two men would play it loud in their car to psych themselves up before an attack (the tape was found in Mulcahy's house when he was arrested on Duffy's evidence).

Duffy also explained how the way they approached and then controlled a victim developed over time so that they became in Bolland's words "shockingly skilled". Duffy spoke in a calm, matter-of-fact way, except when speaking about the Tamboezer murder. Nine months after the series of interviews Duffy was charged with seventeen offences of rape and conspiracy to rape; he pleaded guilty to all offences, all of which he said he carried out with David Mulcahy. He could not be charged with murdering Anne Lock as he had been found not guilty, but was charged with raping her. In March 1999 Duffy appeared at the Old Bailey and pleaded guilty to seventeen offences.

== Mulcahy ==
Following Duffy's claims, Mulcahy was tracked for several months by police, then arrested in February 1999; DNA tests (which were not yet available during the original investigation) conclusively proved his involvement, supported by evidence from a search of his home. He did not answer any questions at interviews. Mulcahy already had a criminal record by this time: in the years following Duffy's conviction he had been convicted of assault occasioning actual bodily harm for beating one of his sons and received a non-custodial sentence. Duffy was going to appear as a prosecution witness at Mulcahy's trial; Mulcahy's defence team sent letters to prisoners on Duffy's wing claiming to be under lawyer/client privilege, informing them that Duffy was the main prosecution witness against Mulcahy, and that if he gave evidence, a miscarriage of justice would take place. This put Duffy in obvious danger, and the prison authorities took action to protect him. A complaint to the solicitors, who had written to prisoners who were not their clients, led to claims that the letters were an error made by a clerical worker.

Mulcahy's trial began in Court No. 1 of the Central Criminal Court (Old Bailey) on 11 September 2000 before the Recorder of London (HHJ Hyam) and a jury. Bolland, an important witness, was accused of conspiring to talk Duffy into giving false evidence against Mulcahy. Duffy appeared as a prosecution witness against Mulcahy and gave detailed evidence over a 14-day period. It was the first time a category A prisoner had given evidence against an accomplice.

Prosecution evidence at the trial presented Mulcahy as the chief perpetrator and the first to decide that sexual stimulation was no longer enough of a thrill; therefore, he decided to murder the victims. Mulcahy, described as "smug and arrogant" in the witness box, denied all allegations and said that Duffy was lying, that the DNA had been planted by the police, and a fingerprint on the tape used during a rape was not his. The defence also applied to have Duffy's interview tapes from the 1980s excluded from evidence.

Mulcahy was convicted of three counts of murder and seven counts of rape and was given three life sentences, with a 30-year recommendation, and 24 years' imprisonment for each full rape offence in February 2001. He was not later given a whole-life tariff, as the ruling barring politically set tariffs had been made by the time his case was due for review.

A few weeks later Duffy was sentenced to 12 years' imprisonment for each of seven full rape offences he had confessed to (although he was already serving a full life sentence). Neither man is expected ever to be released from prison.

There is a website in the name of David Mulcahy, copyrighted under his name in 2011, arguing his innocence and hoping for a retrial.

After Mulcahy was found guilty, police re-opened investigations into hundreds of unsolved rapes and murders across the country, suspecting that the two men may have committed more offences than those Duffy confessed to. Detective Superintendent Andy Murphy said that he suspected Mulcahy had committed other acts of violence against women both on his own and with Duffy, and encouraged any surviving victims to come forward. Despite these inquiries, neither man was ever charged with any further crime.

== In the media ==
- In August 1988 a Crimewatch File episode covered the case 'The Railway Murders', after being shown on Crimewatch UK.
- In 2001 a television documentary Witness of Truth: The Railway Murders was broadcast.
- While not in the public media, Bolland, who had been involved in the case from beginning to end, starting at a junior rank, and played a significant part, wrote a detailed article about his experience in the journal Medicine, Science and the Law in 2002.
- In 2015 the television programme Born to Kill? included an episode about the case in series 6.
- In 2016 a book was written about the case by Simon Farquhar (the son of DS Charles Farquhar), entitled A Dangerous Place: The Story of the Railway Murders. It was shortlisted for the Crime Writers' Association Gold Dagger Award for Non-Fiction.
- Episode 6 of season 2 of the TV series Britain's Most Evil Killers is a documentary about the case, which was broadcast in 2018 on the TV channel Pick.
- The Railway Killers, a documentary about the case with the dramatisation of the murders and interviews with key figures, was broadcast on Channel 5 in three parts, starting on 16 August 2021.
- The UK podcast The True Crime Enthusiast Podcast has covered the tale in a multi part story entitled 'Thriller'

== See also ==
- List of serial killers in the United Kingdom
- Murder of Deborah Linsley – another high-profile (but still unsolved) 'railway murder' in London in 1988
