= Anne Rafferty =

English jurist

The Right Honourable Dame Anne Rafferty DBE FRS
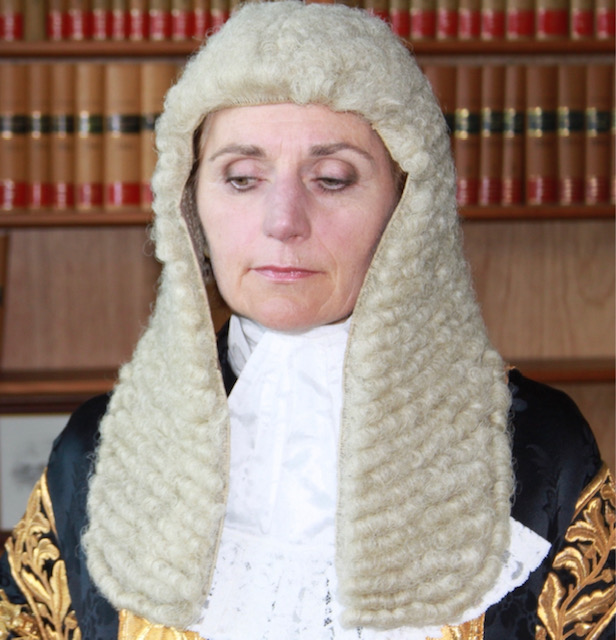

Lady Justice of Appeal
- In office 5 July 2011 – 26 July 2020
- Preceded by: Lord Dyson

Justice of the High Court

Personal details
- Born: Anne Judith Rafferty; 26 July 1950 (age 76)
- Spouse: HHJ Brian Barker CBE KC
- Children: 4 (1 deceased)
- Education: Sheffield University (LLB)

Dame Anne Judith Rafferty FRS (born 26 July 1950) is an English jurist, who served as a Lady Justice of Appeal of England and Wales from 2011 to 2020. She was elected to an Honorary Fellowship of the Royal Society in May 2026.

== Career ==
Educated at Wolverhampton Girls' High School before studying law at the University of Sheffield, Rafferty was the first woman to chair the Criminal Bar Association. She took silk (Queen's Counsel) in 1990 and was appointed a Recorder the following year. In 1999, she was promoted Deputy High Court Judge, before her appointment to the High Court of Justice in 2000, when she was assigned to the Queen's Bench Division, receiving the customary accolade of Dame Commander of the Order of the British Empire (DBE).

In 2011, Rafferty was appointed to the Court of Appeal of England and Wales with effect from 5 July, and was sworn of the Privy Council.

In November 2014, her appointment as Chancellor of the University of Sheffield (her alma mater) was announced, to replace Sir Peter Middleton in Summer 2015.

In 2019, Lady Justice Rafferty became known for overturning a lower court decision that Prime Minister Boris Johnson had to face three allegations of misconduct in public office, including a disputed claim that the UK was sending £350m a week to Brussels.

On 10 September 2022, Rafferty attended the Accession Council as a Privy Counsellor and signed the Proclamation of Accession of King Charles III.

In May 2026, Rafferty was elected an Honorary Fellow of the Royal Society.

== Personal life ==
Dame Anne Rafferty is married to fellow lawyer His Honour Judge Brian Barker CBE KC, formerly Recorder of London; they have four daughters.

Academic offices
| Preceded by Sir Peter Middleton | Chancellor of the University of Sheffield; 2015–present | Succeeded by Incumbent |
