= Anthony Benn (Recorder of London) =

Sir Anthony Benn
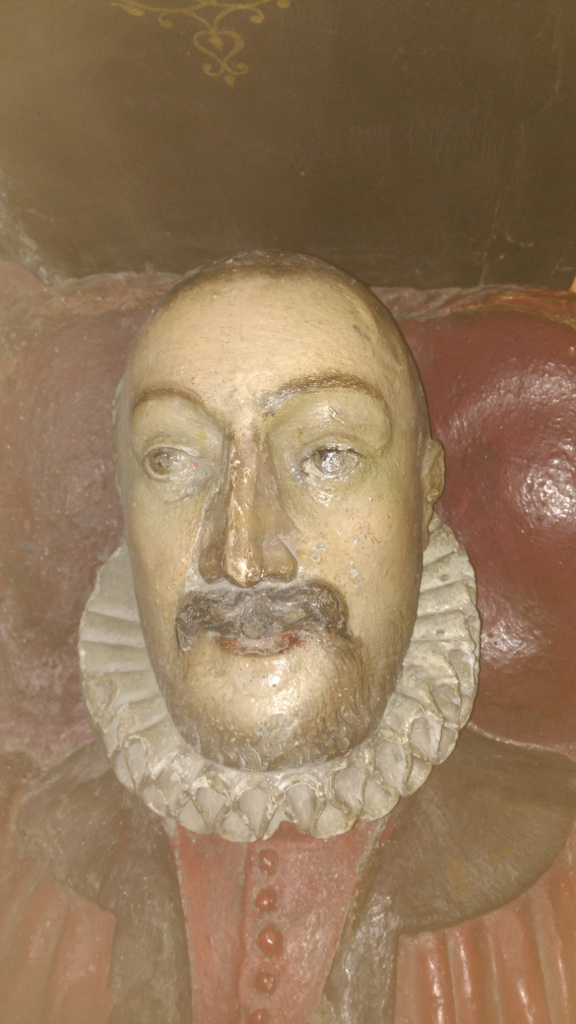
- Effigy of Sir Anthony Benn

Recorder of London
- In office 1616–1618
- Appointed by: James I of England
- Preceded by: Thomas Coventry
- Succeeded by: Richard Martin

Recorder of Kingston
- In office 1610 – 29 September 1618

Personal details
- Born: c. 1568
- Died: 29 September 1618 (aged 50) Kingston upon Thames
- Resting place: All Saints Church, Kingston upon Thames
- Spouse: Jane Eveleyn
- Children: Charles, Amabella
- Parent: Robert Benn
- Education: Broadgates Hall, Oxford
- Profession: Barrister, Judge
- Awards: Kt

Sir Anthony Benn (c. 1568–1618) was a barrister, appointed recorder for the town of Kingston upon Thames in 1610, knighted in 1615 and appointed Recorder of London in 1616 shortly before his death in 1618.

== Early life and education ==
Benn was the first son of Robert Benn, a linen draper of St Nicholas Cole Abbey, London. He had a sister, Anne, who married Edward Goodwyn of Dorking.

He matriculated at Broadgates Hall, Oxford, in January 1584, enrolled at the Middle Temple in 1583, and took Bachelor of Arts at Oxford in 1587.

== Career ==
Benn was called to the bar in 1594, practising in Chancery. Benn was appointed Recorder of Kingston in 1610, raised to the bench and elected Middle Temple autumn reader in 1612, lecturing on the Forcible Entry Act 1429.

Benn was knighted in London on 15 September 1615 at Hyde Park on James I's return to London from Scotland. He was appointed Recorder of London the following year. In January 1618 Benn was expelled from commons at the Middle Temple for offending Lord Chief Justice Sir Henry Montagu.

=== Essays ===
Some manuscripts of Benn's works survive including a collection of about seventy essays held at Bedfordshire County Record Office. Benn's style is noted to be more deferential towards the supremacy of the King, harking back to an Elizabethan tradition and contrasting with attitudes of some of his Jacobean contemporaries. The subjects covered in the essays are wide-ranging and reflect Benn's personal views. One is entitled Of preparations towards Mariadg and contains advice to his then new-born daughter, Amabella.

== Family ==
Benn married Jane Evelyn in about 1601. Several sources state she was the daughter of John Evelyn of Godstone and Kingston and his wife, Elizabeth Stevens and that a George Evelyn, a Six Clerk in Chancery, was an uncle. However, a family tree chart of diarist, John Evelyn, from Memoirs, Illustrative of the Life and Writings of John Evelyn... suggests that for George to have been an uncle, Jane would have been a granddaughter of John and Elizabeth.

In 1605 Benn purchased Norbiton Hall, in Norbiton to the east of Kingston, from the estate of George Evelyn who had died in 1603. His residence at Norbiton is now commemorated by a green plaque.

The couple had at least two children; Charles (b.1608) and Amabella (1616–1698). (Note: Benn's daughter is referred to by differing sources as a Amabel, Ammabel, Amabell, Amabela, Amabella, Ammabella and Annabela.)

== Death ==
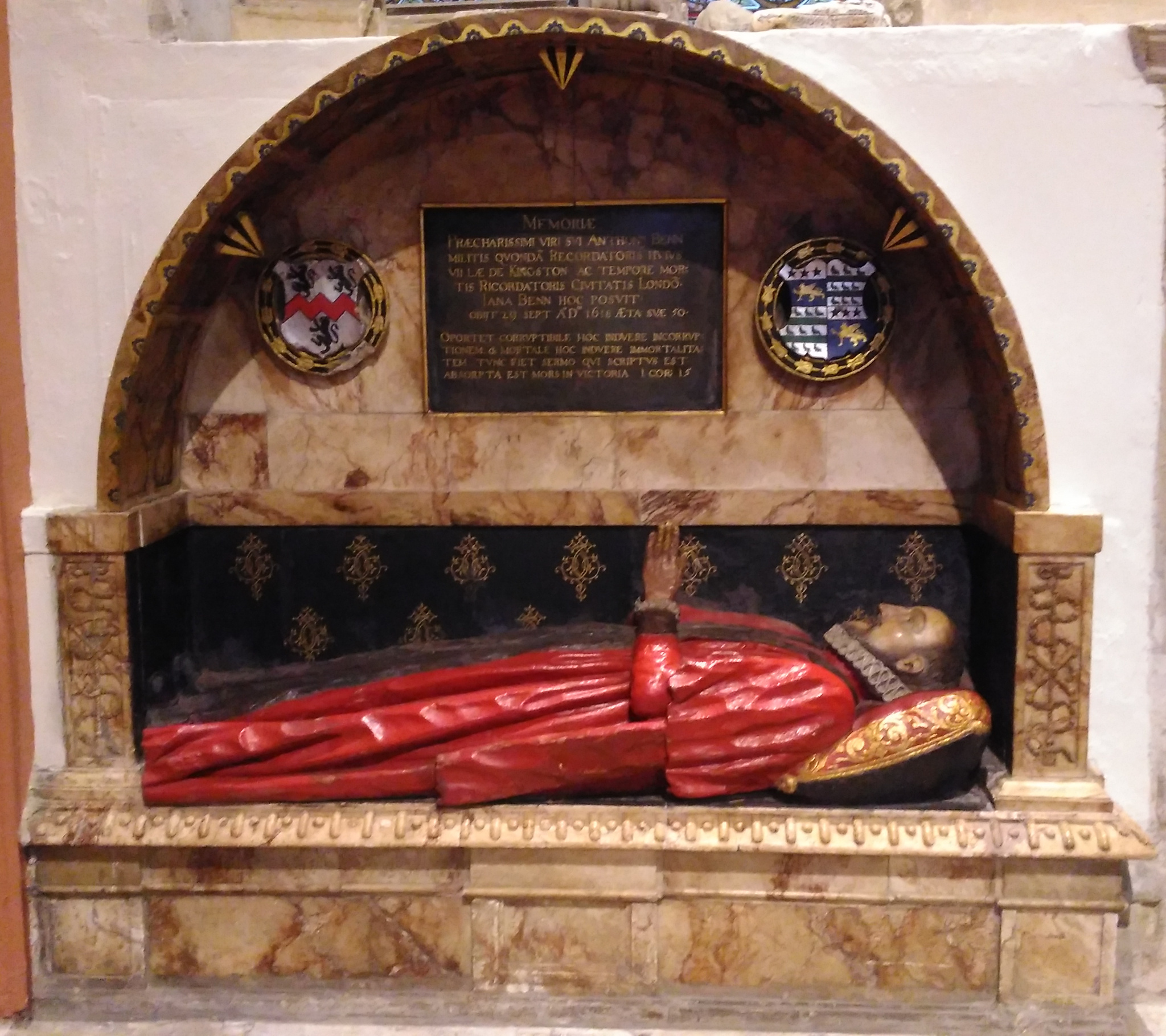
Sir Anthony Benn memorial in All Saints Church, Kingston upon Thames

Anthony Benn died in 1618. At his death he possessed a messuage with appurtenances called 'Popes' with 20 acres (8.1 ha) of land at Norbiton, all held of the bailiffs of Kingston. This 'Popes' is thought not to have been Norbiton Hall however, for Sir Anthony's son and heir Charles Benn was only eight and daughter, Amabella, two years old at the time and Lady Benn is known to have had a house in Kingston a few years later. Little more is known of Benn's son Charles. As Amabella is referred to by several sources as Anthony Benn's heiress, the inference is that he died young.

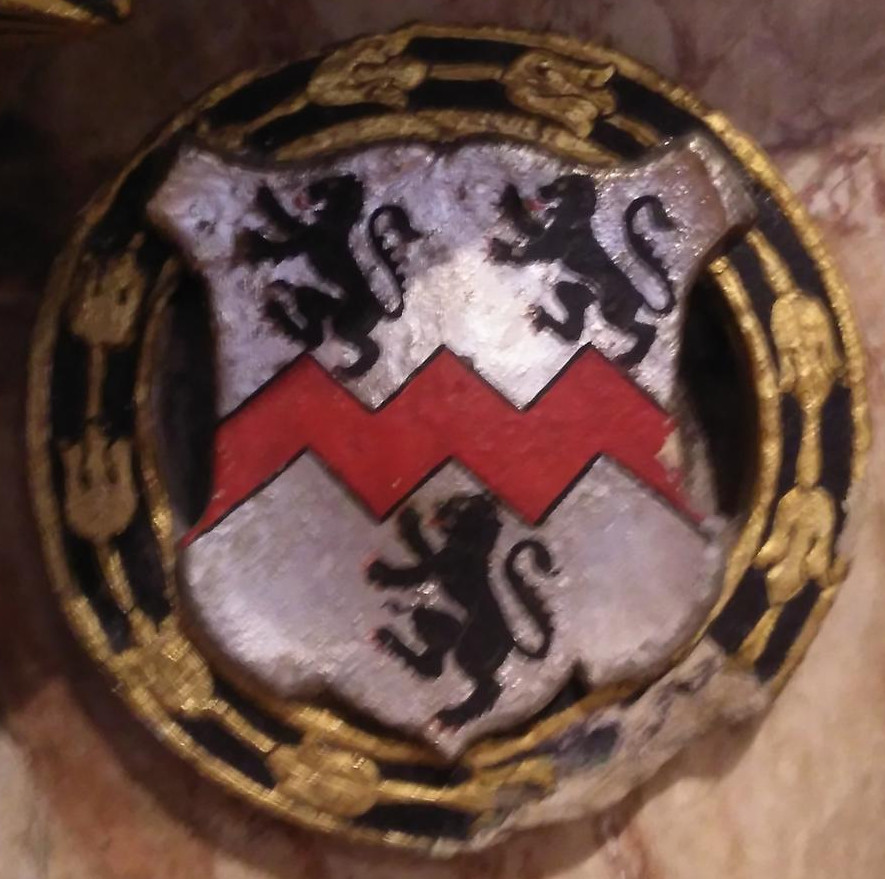

Benn's widow commissioned Benn's memorial effigy and altar tomb, located in the south wall of the chancel of All Saints Church, Kingston upon Thames. It contains Benn's recumbent effigy in his lawyer's robe and ruff collar and cuffs; his hands in prayer, once broken off but since restored. The arch of the recess is a coffered round one of alabaster; the base is low and has shields, both of which were faded but since restored; one is charged quarterly 1 and 4 a griffon on a chief or three molets sable; 2 and 3 or two bars sable between nine martlets sable, three, three and three.

== Survivors ==
Benn's widow, Jane, in later life, remarried to Sir Eustace Hart, a widower twenty years her senior, on 23 January 1656. She died in 1673.

Benn's daughter, Amabella, or Amabel was baptised in Kingston 3 September 1607. She may have married a Mr Dowse (or Douce) at a young age, though this is unclear. Her more notable marriage was to Anthony Fane, son of Francis Fane, 1st Earl of Westmorland who fought with the parliamentarians and died from injury sustained during the taking of Farnham Castle in 1643. She remarried Henry Grey, 10th Earl of Kent on 1 August 1644. They had two children: Anthony, who inherited the earldom, and Elizabeth, who married Banastre Maynard, 3rd Baron Maynard. Henry died in 1651 but Amabella survived long after, living to the age of 92. Both Lady Jane and Amabella are entombed in the de Grey Mausoleum, Flitton.

== See also ==
- Wrest Park

== Notes ==
Legal offices
Preceded by Thomas Coventry	Recorder of London; 1616–1618	Succeeded by Richard Martin
