= Alexia Durran =

Her Honour Judge Durran

Chief Coroner of England and Wales
- Incumbent
- Assumed office 25 May 2024
- Preceded by: Thomas Teague

Personal details
- Born: Alexia Grainne Durran; 1971 (age 54–55)
- Education: St Catharine's College, Cambridge; University of Westminster

Alexia Grainne Durran (born 1971) is a British barrister, judge and coroner. Since May 2024, she has been the Chief Coroner of England and Wales. Having been called to the bar in 1995, she was made a circuit judge in 2014 and deputy chief coroner in 2019.

== Early life and education ==
Durran was born in 1971. She was educated at Lady Manners School, a comprehensive school in Bakewell, Derbyshire. She studied English at St Catharine's College, Cambridge, graduating with a Bachelor of Arts (BA) degree in 1992. She completed the Common Professional Examination via University of Westminster.

== Legal career ==
Durran was called to the bar at Middle Temple in 1995. She then practised as a criminal law barrister and belonged the 23 Essex Street chambers. On 23 October 2009, she was appointed as a recorder, a type of part-time judge.

On 6 November 2014, Durran was made a circuit judge, thereby becoming a full-time member of the judiciary; she sat at Guildford Crown Court. Additionally, she was made a tribunal judge, specialising in mental health cases, in 2017, and then also appointed one of two deputy chief coroners in January 2019. On 5 July 2021, she was promoted to senior circuit judge, based at the Central Criminal Court (i.e. the Old Bailey). On 25 May 2024, she was appointed Chief Coroner of England and Wales for a three-year term.
