= Robert Lymbery =

British judge

His Honour Robert Lymbery QC

Common Serjeant of London
- In office 1990–1993

Robert Davison Lymbery QC (14 November 1920 – 13 October 2008) was a British judge who was Common Serjeant in the City of London.

== Early life ==
Lymbery was born into a Nottingham lace manufacturing family and educated at Gresham's School in Norfolk and Pembroke College, Cambridge, where he studied law. In 1940, during the Second World War, he was commissioned into the 17th/21st Lancers of the British Army and posted as a tank commander with the Eighth Army to North Africa, Sicily, mainland Italy, and Greece.

== Judicial career ==
After the war Lymbery returned to Cambridge to complete his degree, before entering the Middle Temple to further his law studies, and was called to the Bar in 1949. He then joined the London chambers of Richard Elwes, QC, in King's Bench Walk, and built a primarily criminal practice on the Midland Circuit. He took Silk in 1967 (i.e. became a Q.C.).

In 1965 he got his first judicial appointment as Recorder of Grantham. He served as chairman of the Rutland Quarter Sessions from 1966 until 1971, and of the Bedford Quarter Sessions from 1969 to 1970, and was Commissioner of Assize in 1971. He became a circuit judge later that same year, based in Bedford, and transferred to the Old Bailey in 1982.

There he presided over some well-publicised trials, such as those of safe deposit robber Valerio Viccei and Winston Silcott, the killer of P.C. Keith Blakelock. He was appointed Common Serjeant in 1990, serving in that position until his retirement in 1993.

Lymbery had married, in 1952, Anne Tuckett, with whom he had three daughters. He died in 2008.
