= Alexander Anne =

Member of the Parliament of England

Alexander Anne or Aune (died 1439) was an English lawyer and politician.

Alexander Anne (also Aune, de Aune, or de Anne) was originally from Frickley in Yorkshire and served as a Justice of the Peace of that county as well as Middlesex. A Citizen-Draper of London, he held numerous offices, including undersheriff for London in 1423 and escheator for Middlesex in 1432. He was a Member (MP) of the Parliament of England for Middlesex in 1430/31, 1432, and 1436/37. Anne was also Recorder of London from 1435 to his death in 1439.
