= Peter Thornton (judge) =

British judge (born 1946)

His Honour Sir Peter Thornton KC

Chief Coroner of England and Wales
- In office 2012–2016
- Preceded by: None
- Succeeded by: Mark Lucraft

Personal details
- Born: 17 October 1946 (age 79)
- Education: St John's College
- Occupation: Judge
- Awards: Knight Bachelor (2017)

Sir Peter Ribblesdale Thornton KC (born 17 October 1946) is a former Senior Circuit Judge and former Chief Coroner of England and Wales.

== Legal career ==
Thornton is the son of Robert Ribblesdale Thornton CBE, a solicitor who served as town clerk in Salford and then Leicester and as a deputy lieutenant of Leicestershire. He was educated at Clifton College and St John's College, Cambridge.

He was called to the bar (Middle Temple) in 1969 and elected a Bencher in 2001. His trial and appellate practice included work in various jurisdictions, such as the Isle of Man and Bermuda, and appearances pro bono in death penalty cases before the Judicial Committee of the Privy Council (which serves as a court of last resort for some Commonwealth realms). He is a founder and former head of London's Doughty Street chambers. He chaired student disciplinary appeals at University College London and the Football Association.

Thornton was made Queen's Counsel in 1992, and became an editor of the practitioner text Archbold also in 1992. He was appointed an assistant recorder in 1994, became a recorder on 26 March 1997, and a deputy High Court judge in 2003. Thornton was appointed a circuit judge on the South Eastern circuit on 12 November 2007. In 2011, having been specially appointed Assistant Deputy Coroner, he presided over the inquest into the death of Ian Tomlinson, who died during protests at the 2009 G20 Summit in London. His appointment came after the Coroner for the City of London requested that ministers appoint an experienced figure.

On 22 May 2012, it was announced Thornton would be appointed as the first Chief Coroner of England and Wales from 17 September 2012. In that capacity he continued to sit on the Administrative Court so he could hear judicial reviews for coronial cases. In 2015, his three-year term of office was extended to 1 October 2016, when he was succeeded by Mark Lucraft QC.

Thornton reached the mandatory retirement age of 70, and retired as a Senior Circuit Judge, from 18 October 2016. He was made a Knight Bachelor in the 2017 Birthday Honours for services to the administration of justice and the Coroner Service.

In November 2020 Thornton was appointed to the Independent Expert Panel which investigates misdemeanours by MPs

In 1981, he married Susan Margaret Dalal; they have a son and a daughter.
