= Thomas Juvenal =

Thomas Juvenal (died 1309) was the first known Common Serjeant of London, an ancient British legal office, first recorded with his appointment in 1291, and which is the second most senior permanent judge in London after the Recorder of London, acting as deputy to that office, and sitting as a judge in the trial of criminal offences.

On 3 May 1291, during the reign of Edward I, and "...in the presence of Ralph de Sandwych, Warden; Gregory de Rokele, Stephen Aswy, Robert de Basinge, Ralph le Blound, William de Farndon, Richard Aswy, John le Blound, Nicholas de Winchester, William de Bettoyne, Adam de Foleham, John de Canterbury, and Walter Hauteyn, Aldermen; Thomas Romeyn and William de Leyre, Sheriffs, Thomas Juvenal was elected by the assent of the foregoing to the office of Common Serjeant of London, and sworn well and faithfully to perform that office, &c."

On his death in 1309 King Edward II and his favourite Piers Gavestone requested that the position be given to John Albon; the request not being received in time, the Mayor, Aldermen, and Sheriffs of the City of London instead gave the office to Thomas de Kent, a Serjeant-at-Mace.

His widow, Alice, died in 1318, and left property to the church of St Agnes in Aldersgate.
