= Michael Hyam =

British judge

His Honour Judge Michael Hyam

Recorder of London
- In office 1998–2004
- Preceded by: Sir Lawrence Verney
- Succeeded by: Peter Beaumont

Personal details
- Born: 18 April 1938
- Died: 8 July 2004 (aged 66)
- Education: Westminster School; St Catharine's College, Cambridge

Michael Joshua Hyam (18 April 1938 – 8 July 2004), styled His Honour Judge Hyam, was a British judge. He was Recorder of London from 1998 until his death.

== Career ==
The son of Isaac and Rachel Hyam, Michael Hyam was educated at Westminster School and St Catharine's College, Cambridge, where he read Law, he was called to the bar in 1962 by Gray's Inn and joined 6 Pump Court Chambers, where he remained until his appointment to the bench. He specialised in the prosecution of complex fraud cases.

Hyam was appointed a circuit judge in 1984, serving until 1998. From 1991 to 1998, he was the Resident Judge and Designated Family Judge at Norwich Crown Court. He was one of the first circuit judges to sit regularly at the Court of Appeal Criminal Division. At Norwich, he introduced joint civil and criminal hearings for cases involving children, which have been adopted across the country.

In 1998, he became Recorder of London, after the post was publicly advertised for the first time in its history. As the senior judge at the Old Bailey, Hyam tried many high-profile criminal cases, including those of politicians Jonathan Aitken and Lord Archer of Weston-super-Mare, murderer and rapist David Mulcahy, and of the terrorist and murderer David Copeland.

Hyam died in service of a heart attack in 2004 after being taken ill at a dinner of the Institute of Barristers’ Clerks.

== Personal life ==
Hyam married Diana Mortimer in 1968: they had three sons.
