= Nicholas Hilliard (judge) =

British judge (born 1959)

The Honourable Mr Justice Hilliard, KC

High Court Judge King's Bench Division
- Incumbent
- Assumed office 2019
- Appointed by: Elizabeth II

Recorder of London
- In office 2015–2019
- Appointed by: Elizabeth II
- Preceded by: Brian Barker
- Succeeded by: Mark Lucraft

Common Serjeant of London
- In office 2013–2015
- Preceded by: Brian Barker
- Succeeded by: Richard Marks

Personal details
- Born: Nicholas Richard Maybury Hilliard; 1 May 1959 (age 67)
- Education: Bradfield College
- Alma mater: Lincoln College, Oxford
- Occupation: Judge
- Profession: Barrister

Sir Nicholas Hilliard, KC (born 1 May 1959), is a British judge, serving as a judge of the High Court of Justice since 19 November 2019. He previously served as Recorder of London, an ancient and senior legal post at the Old Bailey from 2015 to 2019 and before that Common Serjeant of London, the Recorder's deputy, from 2013 to 2015.

== Biography ==
Hilliard was educated at Bradfield College in Berkshire, and Lincoln College, Oxford. Called to the Bar in 1981, he was appointed a Bencher of the Middle Temple in 2003.

In 1995, Hilliard was appointed Treasury Counsel at the Central Criminal Court and served in that capacity until 2008 when he was promoted Senior Treasury Counsel. In 2001, he was appointed as a Recorder of the Crown Court and in 2003, became a Master of the Bench at the Middle Temple. Chairman of the Criminal Bar Association from 2005 to 2006, Hilliard took silk in 2008. In that year he led the prosecution of the murderers of Ben Kinsella.

Sir Nicholas is also a King's Counsel.

=== Prosecutor ===
In 2003, Hilliard led the prosecution of the case of R v Ingram, C., Ingram, D. and Whittock, T. In 2011, on behalf of the Crown Prosecution Service, he unsuccessfully prosecuted Jonathan Rees for the 1987 murder of private investigator Daniel Morgan, who had been examining police corruption. Hilliard acknowledged the police could not be relied upon to ensure access to documents that the defence might require and the prosecution was fatally undermined as a result and Rees was discharged.

=== Judicial career ===
Hilliard was appointed a Senior Circuit Judge in 2012, making him the Resident Judge on the South Eastern Circuit, based at Woolwich Crown Court. He was subsequently appointed Common Serjeant of London then Recorder of London before advancement as a judge of the High Court of Justice in November 2019.

Sir Nicholas has been a contributing editor to Archbold Criminal Pleading, Evidence and Practice since 1994.

== Honours and appointments ==
- Knight Bachelor (2019)
  - Liveryman of the Worshipful Company of Feltmakers.

Legal offices
Preceded by Brian Barker	Recorder of London; 2015 – 2019	Succeeded by Mark Lucraft
Preceded by Brian Barker	Common Serjeant of London; 2013 – 2015	Succeeded by Richard Marks
