= Common Serjeant of London =

British legal office

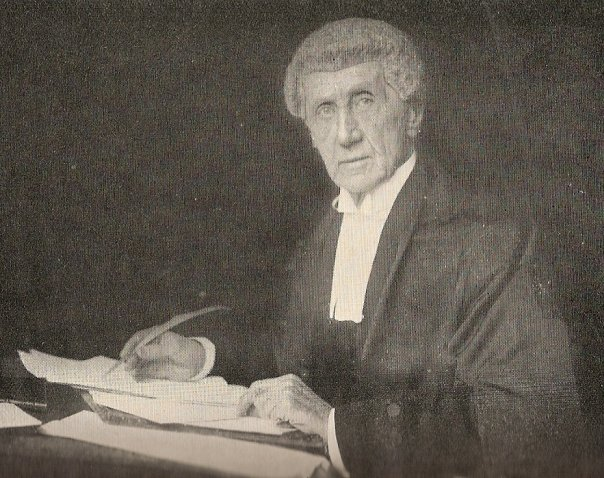
Sir Henry F. Dickens, KC, Common Serjeant of London 1917 – 1932

The Common Serjeant of London (full title The Serjeant-at-Law in the Common Hall) is an ancient British legal office, first recorded in 1291, and is the second most senior permanent judge of the Central Criminal Court after the Recorder of London, acting as deputy to that office, and sitting as a judge in the trial of criminal offences.

He is also one of the High Officers of the City of London Corporation, and must undertake certain civic obligations alongside his judicial duties: each Midsummer he presides at the election of Sheriffs in the Guildhall, and each Michaelmas he plays a key role in the ceremonial election of the Lord Mayor. He presents the Sheriffs to the King's Remembrancer at the annual Quit Rents ceremony, and is in attendance on most other major ceremonial occasions.

The Common Serjeant is appointed by the monarch on the recommendation of the Lord Chancellor.

Formerly, the Common Serjeant of London was a legal officer of the City Corporation of London. The Common Serjeant of London attended on the Lord Mayor of London and the Court of Aldermen on court days, and acted with them in council. He also attended the Court of Aldermen and Common Council, and had charge of the Orphans' Estates

Judge Richard Marks, KC, was appointed the 81st Common Serjeant on 3 March 2015.

== Incomplete list of Common Serjeants ==
- Thomas Juvenal (1291–1309)
- Thomas de Kent (1309–c.1318)
- Gregory de Norton (c.1318–1329)
- William de Ford (1333–1353)
- John Wentbrigg (c.1353–1362)
- Ralph Strode (c.1375–1385)
- John Tremayne (1388–1389)
- John Fray (1421–1422)
- Alexander Anne (1424–?1435)
- John Wilton (1437–?1441)
- Robert Danvers (1441–1442)
- Richard Moyle (1441–?1443)
- Thomas Billing (1443–1449)
- John Nedeham (1448–?1452)
- Thomas Urswick (1452–1455)
- Robert Ingleton (1454–1456)
- Guy Fairfax (1456–?1457)
- Thomas Rigby (1457–?1460)
- Thomas Bryan (1460–1463)
- John Baldwyn (1463–1469)
- Robert Molyneux (1469–)
- John Haugh
- Richard Higham
- Thomas Frowyk (1486–1496)
- Thomas Marowe (1496–)
- John Greene (1495–)
- Henry White
- William Walsingham of Gray's Inn (1526–)
- John Onley (1530–1533)
- Edward Hall (1533–1535)
- Robert Southwell (1535–1536)
- Thomas Atkyns
- Sir Robert Broke (1536–1546)
- John Marshe (1547–1563)
- Bernard Randolph (1563–1583)
- Thomas Kirton (1583–1601)
- Richard Wilbraham (died 1601)
- Richard Wheler of Lincoln's Inn (1601–?1608)
- Daniel Hills of Lincoln's Inn
- Thomas Jones of Gray's Inn (died 1625 - Sergeant for 12 years)
- Ralph Latham (died 1641)
- Henry Proby (1643–) (died 1660)
- Sir Richard Browne, 2nd Baronet (1661–1671)
- George Jeffreys (1671–1678)
- Henry Crispe (1678–1700)
- Duncan Dee (1700–1720)
- John Lingard (1720–1729)
- Thomas Garrard (1729–1758)
- Thomas Nugent (1758–1790)
- John Silvester (1790–1803)
- Newman Knowlys (1803–1811)
- Thomas Denman, 1st Baron Denman (1822–1830)
- Charles Ewan Law (1830–1833)
- John Mirehouse of Angle, Pembrokeshire (1833–1850)
- Edward Bullock (1850–1855)
- Thomas Chambers (1857–1878)
- Sir William Thomas Charley (1878–1892)
- Sir Forrest Fulton (1892–1900)
- Sir Frederick Albert Bosanquet (1900–1917)
- Sir Henry Fielding Dickens (1917–1932)
- Henry Holman Gregory (1932–1934)
- Cecil Whiteley (1934–1942)
- Sir Hugh Loveday Beazley (1942–1953)
- Sir Edward Anthony Hawke (1954–1959)
- Sir Carl Aarvold (1959–1964)
- Mervyn Griffith-Jones (1964–1979)
- Sir John Leonard (1979–1981)
- Sir David Tudor Price (1981–84)
- Thomas Herbert Pigot (1984–90)
- Robert Lymbery (1990–1993)
- Neil Denison (1993–2001)
- Peter Beaumont (2001–2004)
- Brian Barker (2005–2013)
- Nicholas Hilliard (2013–2015) (80th Serjeant)
- Richard Marks (2015–Present)

== Gallery ==
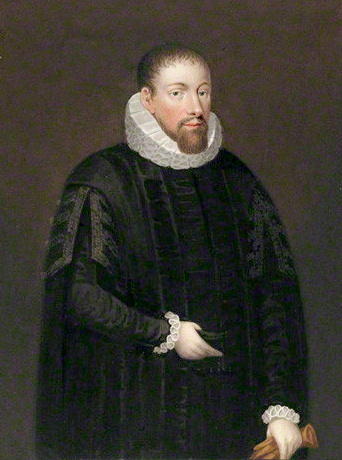
Sir Robert Broke, Common Serjeant of London in 1536

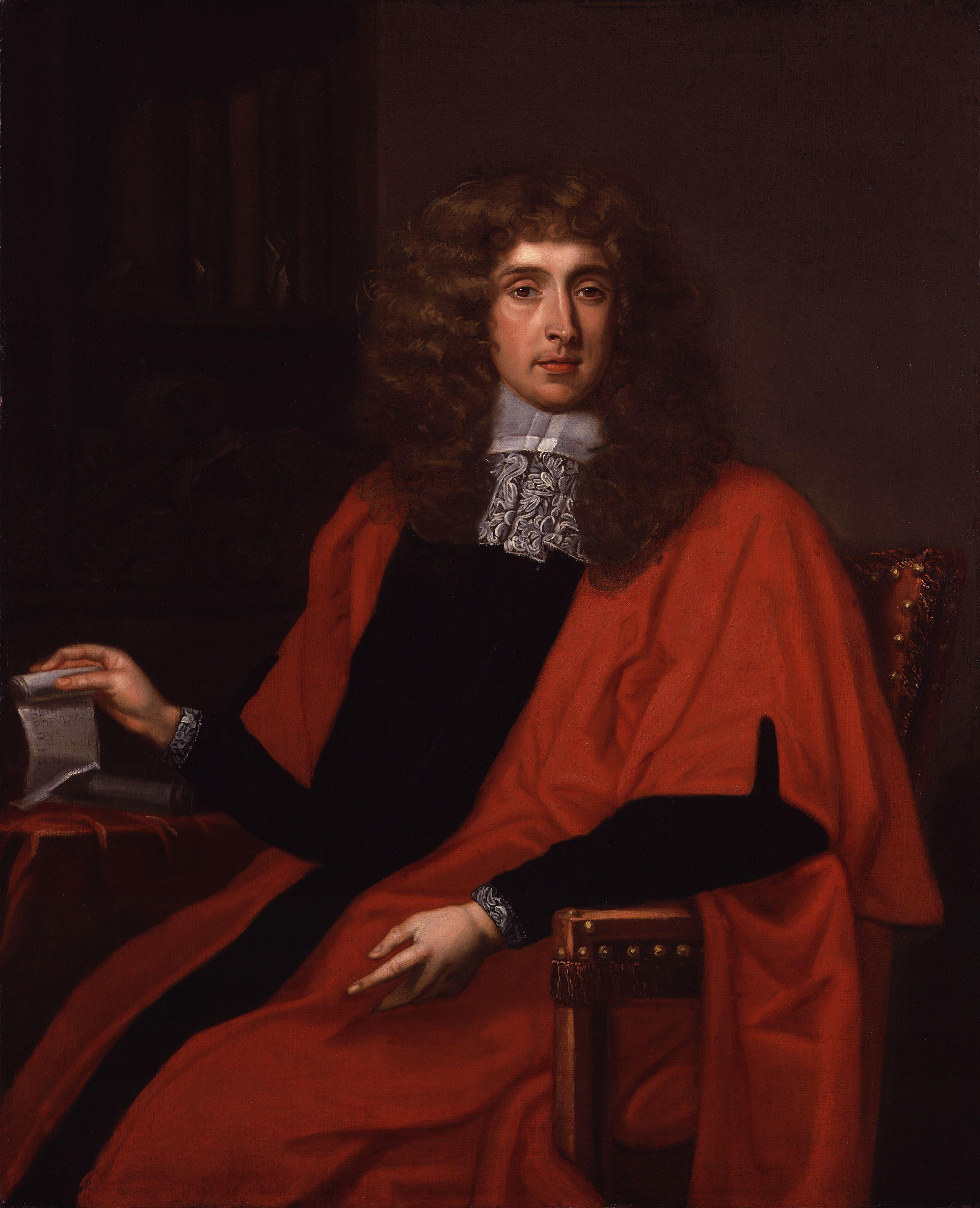
Judge George Jeffreys, Common Serjeant of London in 1671

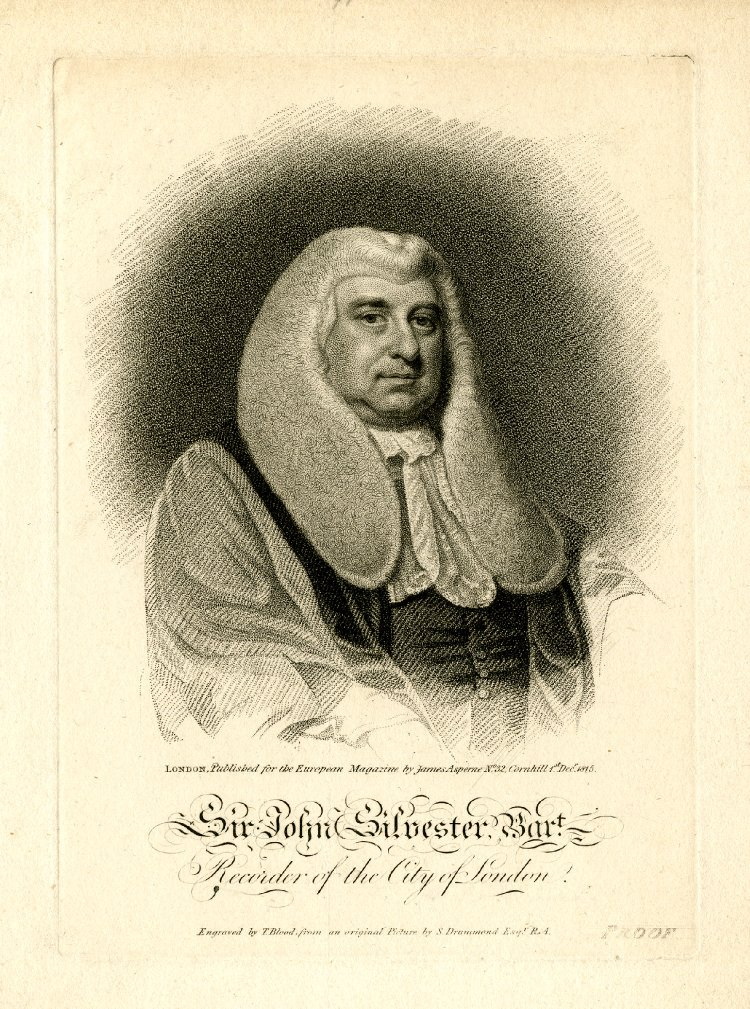
Sir John Silvester, Common Serjeant 1790-1803

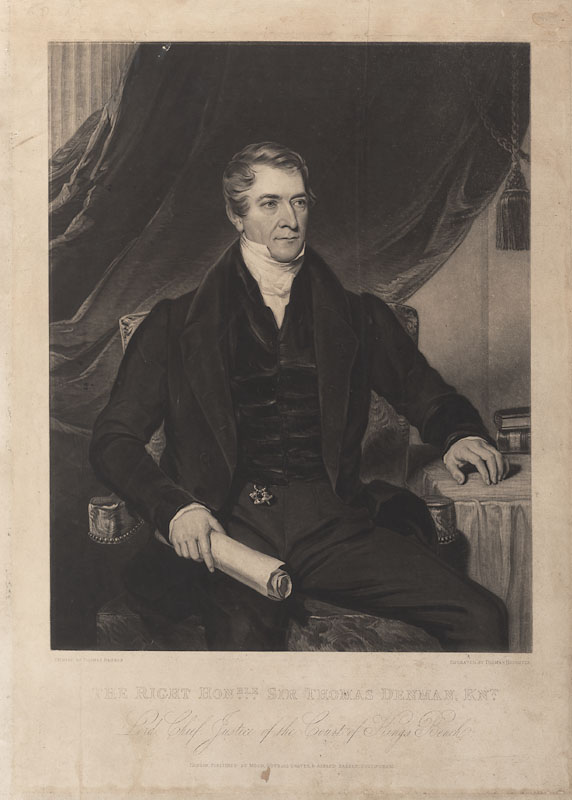
Lord Denman, Common Serjeant of London 1822 - 1830

William Thomas Charley, Common Serjeant of London in 1878

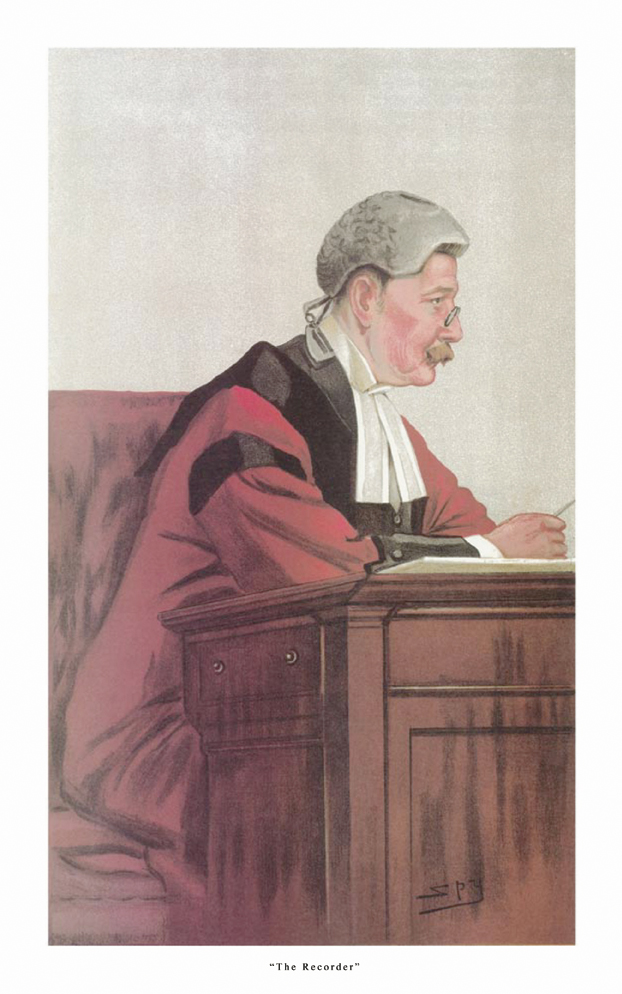
Sir Forrest Fulton by 'Spy' in Vanity Fair (1903)

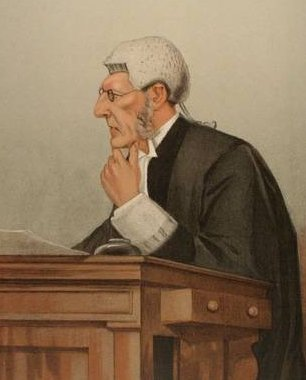
Sir Frederick Bosanquet as Common Serjeant of London. Caricature by 'Spy' from Vanity Fair (1901)

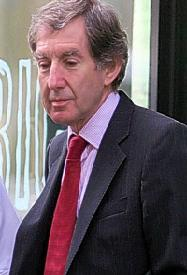
Judge Brian Barker QC, Common Serjeant of London 2005 to 2013
