= Mark Lucraft =

English barrister and judge (born 1961)

His Honour Judge Mark Lucraft KC

Recorder of London
- Incumbent
- Assumed office 2020
- Monarchs: Elizabeth II; Charles III
- Preceded by: Sir Nicholas Hilliard

Chief Coroner of England and Wales
- In office 2016–2020
- Preceded by: Sir Peter Thornton
- Succeeded by: Thomas Teague

Personal details
- Born: 28 December 1961 (age 64)
- Education: University of Kent
- Profession: Barrister-at-law

Mark Lucraft KC (born 28 December 1961) is an English barrister and judge.

Lucraft was appointed Recorder of London in 2020, the most senior Circuit Judge at the Old Bailey and previously served as Chief Coroner of England and Wales from 2016 to 2020.

== Biography ==
The son of the Revd Cyril Lucraft, a United Reformed Church minister, he was educated at Wood Green School, a state comprehensive school in the market town of Witney, Oxfordshire, before going up to the University of Kent, where he read Law. Lucraft graduated as BA in 1983.

Lucraft was called to the Bar in 1984. Appointed Recorder in 2003, he took silk (QC) in 2006, becoming a full-time judge in 2012 and was a Senior Circuit Judge at the Central Criminal Court ("Old Bailey") from 2015, where he was appointed as Resident Judge in April 2020. Prominent cases include a life sentence in 2024 for Fiona Beal, who murdered her partner Nicholas Billingham in 2021.

From 2016 to 2020, Lucraft was Chief Coroner of England and Wales, while continuing as an Old Bailey judge. As Chief Coroner, he presided over the inquests into the 2017 Westminster attack, the 2017 London Bridge and Borough Market attack, and the 2019 London Bridge stabbings.

In 2020, before relinquishing the role of Chief Coroner, he became Recorder of London, the senior judge at the Old Bailey. The roles were allowed to overlap due to the pressures caused by the COVID-19 pandemic. By tradition, the Recorder of London is also appointed High Steward of Southwark, and Lucraft accordingly occupies this position. In October 2023, he ruled that the name and date of birth of the police officer who shot Chris Kaba could be made public on 30 January 2024.

Lucraft is the general editor of Archbold Criminal Pleading, Evidence and Practice, an annual publication for practitioners of criminal law in the Crown Courts. He is a Liveryman of the Founders' Company and an Honorary Liveryman of the Curriers' Company.

Legal offices
Preceded by Sir Peter Thornton	Chief Coroner of England and Wales; 2016 to 2020	Succeeded by Thomas Teague
Preceded by Sir Nicholas Hilliard	Recorder of London; 2020 to present	Incumbent
