= Coroner =

Government official who confirms and certifies the death of an individual

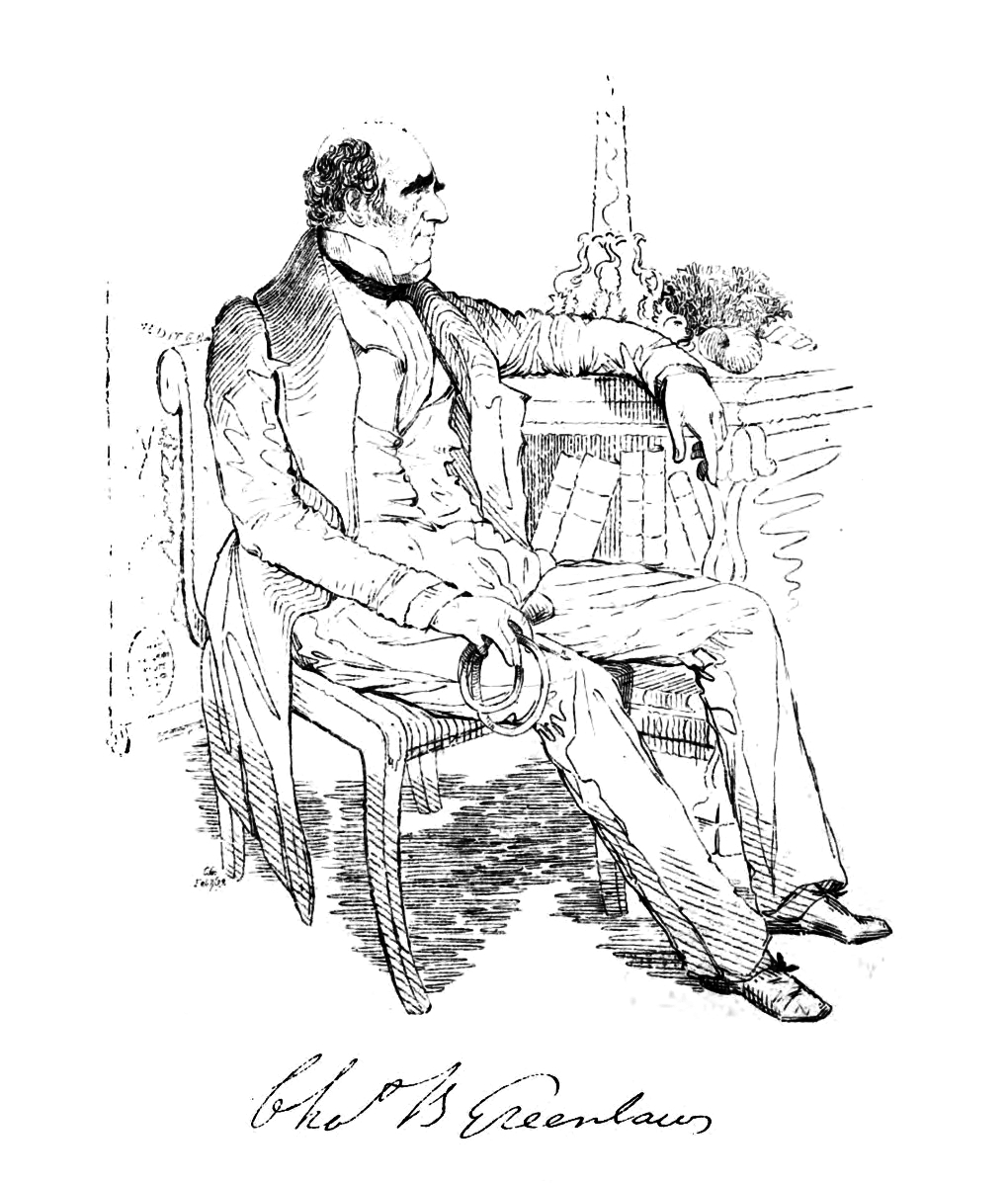
Charles B Greenlaw, Coroner of Calcutta

A coroner is a government or judicial official who is empowered to conduct or order an inquest into the manner or cause of death. The official may also investigate or confirm the identity of an unknown person who has been found dead within the coroner's jurisdiction.

In Medieval England, English coroners were Crown officials who held financial powers and conducted some judicial investigations in order to counterbalance the power of sheriffs or bailiffs.

Depending on the jurisdiction, the coroner may adjudge the cause of death personally, making their decisions within a coroner's court, or may act as the presiding officer of a special court (a "coroner's jury"). The term coroner derives from the same source as the word crown.

== Duties and functions ==
Responsibilities of the coroner may include overseeing the investigation and certification of deaths related to mass disasters that occur within the coroner's jurisdiction. A coroner's office typically maintains death records of those who have died within the coroner's jurisdiction.

The additional roles that a coroner may oversee in judicial investigations may be subject to the attainment of suitable legal and medical qualifications. The qualifications required of a coroner vary significantly between jurisdictions and are described below under the entry for each jurisdiction. Coroners, medical examiners and forensic pathologists are different professions. They have different roles and responsibilities.

== Etymology and history ==
The office of coroner originated in medieval England, first constituted in the reign of Richard I, and has since been adopted in many other countries whose legal systems have their roots in English or United Kingdom law.

In September 1194, the king's itinerant justices in Eyre were required to ensure that in each county of England three knights and a clerk were elected to serve as 'keepers of the pleas of the crown' (custodes placitorum coronae, from whence the word "coroner"). The duties with which the office was entrusted, and which were involved in 'keeping' the crown pleas—which included holding inquests upon dead bodies found within his jurisdiction, hearing the confessions and appeals of felons, and receiving abjurations of the realm made by felons who had taken sanctuary—were not new in 1194. Many of them had previously been performed by a range of local officials, such as the county justiciar (an office in place under Kings Henry I and Stephen), or the serjeant or bailiff of the hundred. For a few decades after the institution of the office of coroner, however, his precise duties were often unclear, and there remained a degree of power-sharing with these officials: the serjeants continued to perform valid inquests on dead bodies and sometimes hear appeals and confessions as late as 1225, despite a plea of the barons to King John in 1215 that 'no sheriff concern himself with pleas of the crown without the coroners'.

"Keeping the pleas" was an administrative task, while "holding the pleas" was a judicial one that was not assigned to the locally resident coroner but left to judges who traveled around the country holding assize courts. The role of custos rotulorum or keeper of the county records became an independent office, which after 1836 was held by the lord-lieutenant of each county.

The person who found a body from a death thought sudden or unnatural was required to raise the "hue and cry" and to notify the coroner. While coronial manuals written for sheriffs, bailiffs, justices of the peace and coroners were published in the sixteenth and seventeenth centuries, handbooks specifically written for coroners were distributed in England in the eighteenth century.

Coroners were introduced into Wales following its military conquest by Edward I of England in 1282 through the Statute of Rhuddlan in 1284.

== By region ==
=== Australia ===
Australian coroners are responsible for investigating and determining the cause of death for those cases reported to them. In all states and territories, a coroner is a magistrate with legal training, and is attached to a local court. Five states – New South Wales, Queensland, South Australia, Victoria and Western Australia – also have state coroners and specialised coronial courts. In Tasmania, the Chief Magistrate also acts as the state coroner.

=== Brazil ===
In Brazil, coroner work is done by Médicos-Legistas (Lawful Physicians), that are police officers and forensic experts with degrees in medicine.

In the Department of Federal Police, the Médicos-Legistas work on highly complex federal crimes involving corpses that need to be examined by the Forensic Medicine and Dentistry Sector linked to the National Institute of Criminalistics.

Throughout the federative units, the Civil Polices (in Federal District and other 8 States) or Scientific Polices (in all other 18 States) disposes of their own Legal-Medical Institutes (mainly responsible for confirming the authorship, dynamics and materiality of offenses involving living beings or their respective corpses) and, with the exception of Paraná, the Médicos-Legistas constitute a police career of their own.

=== Canada ===
According to Statistics Canada,

Death investigation is the responsibility of each individual Canadian province and territory—there is no overarching federal authority. As a result, each province and territory has developed its own system and legislation to fulfill the mandate of investigating deaths that are unexpected, unexplained, or as a result of injuries or drugs. Two different death investigation systems have developed in Canada: the Coroner's system and the Medical Examiner's system. The Coroner's system is used in the majority of provinces and territories. It is a system that is centuries old and originated in Great Britain. It is found throughout the world in countries that were former British colonies, including Canada. The Medical Examiner's system (used in Alberta, Manitoba, Nova Scotia, and Newfoundland and Labrador) is just over one century old and originated in the United States. Although there are some differences between the two systems, the ultimate goal of each is the same—to investigate certain deaths defined in their legislation and establish the identity of the deceased together with the cause of death and the manner of death.

In 21st-century Canada the officer responsible for investigating all unnatural and natural unexpected, unexplained, or unattended deaths goes under the title "coroner" or "medical examiner" depending on location. They do not determine civil or criminal responsibility, but instead make and offer recommendations to improve public safety and prevention of death in similar circumstances.

Coroner or Medical Examiner services are under the jurisdiction of provincial or territorial governments, and in modern Canada generally operate within the public safety and security or justice portfolio. These services are headed by a Chief Coroner (or Chief Medical Examiner) and comprise coroners or medical examiners appointed by the executive council.

The provinces of Alberta, Manitoba, Nova Scotia and Newfoundland and Labrador now have a Medical Examiner system, meaning that all death investigations are conducted by specialist physicians trained in Forensic Pathology, with the assistance of other medical and law enforcement personnel. All other provinces run on a coroner system. In Prince Edward Island, and Ontario, all coroners are, by law, physicians.

In the other provinces and territories with a coroner system, namely British Columbia, Saskatchewan, Quebec, New Brunswick, Northwest Territories, Nunavut, and Yukon, coroners are not necessarily physicians but generally have legal, medical, or investigative backgrounds.

=== Hong Kong ===
The Coroner's Court is responsible to inquire into the causes and circumstances of some deaths. The Coroner is a judicial officer who has the power to:

- Grant:
  - Burial orders
  - Cremation orders
  - Waivers of autopsy
  - Autopsy orders
  - Exhumation orders
  - Orders to remove dead bodies outside Hong Kong
- Order police investigations of death
- Order inquests
- Approve removal and use of body parts of the dead body
- Issue certificates of fact of death

The Coroner makes orders after considering the pathologist's report.

=== Ireland ===
The Coroners Service is a network of Coroners working across Ireland, usually covering areas based on Ireland's traditional counties. They are appointed by local authorities as independent experts and must be either qualified doctors or lawyers. Their primary function is to investigate any sudden, unexplained, violent or unnatural death in order to allow a death certificate to be issued. Any death due to unnatural causes will require an inquest to be held.

=== New Zealand ===
The coronial system operates under the Coroners Act 2006, which:

- Established the office of the chief coroner to provide leadership and coordination
- Moved to a smaller number of full-time legally-qualified coroners who are Judges of the Coroners Court
- Ensured families are notified of significant steps in the coronial process
- Introduced wide-ranging cultural matters to be considered in all aspects of dealing with the dead body
- Introduced a specific regime for attention and release of body parts and body samples
- Enhanced inquiry and inquest processes

=== Sri Lanka ===
In Sri Lanka, the Ministry of Justice appoints Inquirers into Sudden Deaths under the Code of Criminal Procedure to carry out an inquest into the death of a sudden, unexpected and suspicious nature. Some large cities such as Colombo and Kandy have a City Coroners' Court attached to the main city hospital, with a Coroner and Additional Coroner.

=== United Kingdom ===
There are separate coroner services for England and Wales and for Northern Ireland. There are no longer coroners in Scotland. Coroners existed in Scotland between about 1400 and 1800 when they ceased to be used. Deaths in Scotland requiring judicial examination are now reported to The Crown Office and Procurator Fiscal Service, who investigates deaths on behalf of the Lord Advocate. Different teams investigating deaths include the Scottish Fatalities Investigation Unit, the National Homicide Team, the Health and Safety Investigation Unit, the Road Traffic Fatalities Investigation Unit and The Custody Deaths Unit.

In the rest of the United Kingdom a coroner is a specialist judge. Whilst coroners are appointed and paid by local authorities, they are not employees of those local authorities but rather independent judicial office holders who can be removed from office only by the Lord Chief Justice and the Lord Chancellor. The Ministry of Justice, which is headed by the Lord Chancellor and Secretary of State for Justice, is responsible for coronial law and policy. However, it has no operational responsibility for the running of coroners' courts.

A coroner's jurisdiction is limited to determining who the deceased was and how, when and where they came by their death. When the death is suspected to have been either sudden with unknown cause, violent or unnatural, the coroner decides whether to hold a post-mortem examination and, if necessary, an inquest. The majority of deaths are not investigated by the coroner. If the deceased has been under medical care, or has been seen by a doctor within 14 days of death, then the doctor can issue a death certificate. However, if the deceased died without being seen by a doctor, or if the doctor is unwilling to make a determination, the coroner will investigate the cause and manner of death. The coroner will also investigate when a death is deemed violent or unnatural, where the cause is unknown, where a death is the result of poisoning or industrial injury, or if it occurred in police custody or prison.

The coroner's court is a court of law, and accordingly the coroner may summon witnesses. Those found to be lying are guilty of perjury. Additional powers of the coroner may include the power of subpoena and attachment, the power of arrest, the power to administer oaths, and sequester juries of six during inquests. Any person aware of a dead body lying in the district of a coroner has a duty to report it to the coroner; failure to do so is an offence. This can include bodies brought into England or Wales.

The coroner has a team of coroner's officers (previously often ex-police officers, but increasingly from a nursing or other paramedical background) who carry out the investigation on the coroner's behalf. A coroner's investigation may involve a simple review of the circumstances, ordering a post-mortem examination, or they may decide that an inquest is appropriate. When a person dies in the custody of the legal authorities (in police cells, or in prison), an inquest must be held. In England, inquests are usually heard without a jury (unless the coroner wants one). However, a case in which a person has died under the control of central authority must have a jury, as a check on the possible abuse of governmental power.

Coroners also have a role in treasure cases. This role arose from the ancient duty of the coroner as a protector of the property of the Crown. It is now contained in the Treasure Act 1996. This jurisdiction is no longer exercised by local coroners, but by specialist "coroners for treasure" appointed by the Chief Coroner.

==== Inquest conclusions (previously called verdicts) ====
The coroner's former power to name a suspect in the inquest conclusion and commit them for trial has been abolished. The coroner's conclusion sometimes is persuasive for the police and Crown Prosecution Service, but normally proceedings in the coroner's court are suspended until after the outcome of any criminal case is known. More usually, a coroner's conclusion is also relied upon in civil proceedings and insurance claims. The coroner commonly tells the jury which conclusions are lawfully available in a particular case.

The most common short-form conclusions include:

- Natural causes
- Industrial disease
- Alcohol or drug related
- Suicide
- Accident/misadventure
- Road traffic collision
- Lawful killing
- Open verdict
- Unlawful killing
- Still birth

Alternatively, an inquest may return a narrative conclusion, a brief statement explaining the circumstances how the person came about their death. A coroner giving a narrative conclusion may choose to refer to the other conclusion. A narrative conclusion may also consist of answers to a set of questions posed by the coroner to himself or to the jury (as appropriate).

Lawful killing includes lawful self-defence. There is no material difference between an accidental death conclusion and one of misadventure. Neglect cannot be a conclusion by itself. It must be part of another conclusion. A conclusion of neglect requires that there was a need for relevant care (such as nourishment, medical attention, shelter or warmth) identified, and there was an opportunity to offer or provide that care that was not taken. An open conclusion should only be used as a last resort and is given where the cause of death cannot be identified on the evidence available to the inquest.

Conclusions are arrived at on the balance of probabilities; prior to 2020, conclusions of suicide or unlawful killing were required to be proved to the criminal standard of beyond reasonable doubt.

==== England and Wales ====
The coroner service in England and Wales is supervised by the Chief Coroner, a judge appointed by the Lord Chief Justice after consulting the Lord Chancellor. The Chief Coroner provides advice, guidance and training to coroners and aims at securing uniformity of practice throughout England and Wales. The post is currently part-time. The present Chief Coroner is Alexia Durran.

England and Wales are divided into coroner districts by the Lord Chancellor, each district consisting of the area or areas of one or more local authorities. The relevant local authority, with the consent of the Chief Coroner and the Lord Chancellor, must appoint a senior coroner for the district. It must also appoint area coroners (in effect deputies to the senior coroner) and assistant coroners, to the number that the Lord Chancellor considers necessary in view of the physical character and population of the district. The cost of the coroner service for the district falls upon the local authority or authorities concerned and thus ultimately upon the local inhabitants. There are 98 coroners in England and Wales, covering 109 local authority areas.

To become a coroner in England and Wales the applicant must be a qualified solicitor, barrister, or a Fellow of the Chartered Institute of Legal Executives (CILEx) with at least five years' qualified experience. This reflects the role of a coroner: to determine the cause of death of a deceased in cases where the death was sudden, was unexpected, occurred abroad, was suspicious in any way or happened while the person was under the control of central authority (e.g. in police custody). Until 2013 a qualified medical practitioner could be appointed but that is no longer possible. Any medical coroner still in office will either have been appointed before 2013, or, exceptionally, hold both medical and legal qualifications.

Formerly every justice of the High Court was ex officio a coroner for every district in England and Wales. This is no longer so; there are now no ex officio coroners. A senior judge is sometimes appointed ad hoc as a deputy coroner to undertake a high-profile inquest, such as those into the deaths of Diana, Princess of Wales and the victims of the 2005 London bombings.

Coroners have a legal duty to issue prevention-of-future-death reports to people, organisations, local authorities, government departments or agencies when they believe action should be taken to prevent future deaths. This duty is detailed within the Coroners and Justice Act 2009 (paragraph 7 of schedule 5). Such reports have been issued to the government, councils, landlords and mental-health trusts. Thematic analysis of prevention of future death reports within healthcare, identified common themes, including deficit in skill or knowledge, missed, delayed or uncoordinated care, communication and cultural issues, systems issues and lack of resources. 36 reports detailed concerns that they were having to repeat the same problems, to the same organisations, that were outlined in previous prevention-of-future-deaths reports. The prevention-of-future-deaths report for Awaab Ishak influenced future legislation. Known as Awaab’s Law, this was introduced in July 2023 as part of the Social Housing (Regulation) Act.

In 2017 legislative changes took place to the Deprivation of Liberty Safeguards. This affected people who die while deprived of their liberty on the grounds of mental health. As from 3 April 2017 a person subject to DoLS has not been considered to be in state detention and therefore any deaths on or after this date are no longer required to be reported to the coroner. In September 2024 further legislative changes took place that allow medical practitioners to complete a medical certificate cause of death if they have attended the deceased in their lifetime rather than within the last 28 days, which will greatly reduce the number of deaths being referred to the coroner service.

==== Northern Ireland ====
Coronial services in Northern Ireland are broadly similar to those in England and Wales, including dealing with treasure trove cases under the Treasure Act 1996. Northern Ireland has three coroners, who oversee the province as a whole. They are assisted by coroners' liaison officers and a medical officer.

=== United States ===
As of 2004, of the 2,342 death investigation offices in the United States, 1,590 were coroners' offices, 82 of which served jurisdictions of more than 250,000 people. Qualifications for coroners are set by individual states and counties in the U.S. and vary widely. In many jurisdictions, little or no training is required, even though a coroner may overrule a forensic pathologist in naming a cause of death. Some coroners are elected with others appointed. Some coroners hold office by virtue of holding another office. For example, in Nebraska, a county's district attorney is also the county's coroner. Similarly, in many counties in Texas, the justice of the peace may be in charge of death investigation. In yet other places, the sheriff may be the lawful coroner.

In different jurisdictions the terms "coroner" and "medical examiner" are defined differently. In some places, stringent rules require that the medical examiner be a forensic pathologist. In others, the medical examiner must be a physician, though not necessarily a pathologist nor further specialized forensic pathologist; physicians with no experience in forensic medicine have become medical examiners. In other jurisdictions, such as Wisconsin, each county sets standards, and in some, the medical examiner does not need any medical or educational qualifications.

Not all U.S. jurisdictions use a coroner system for medicolegal death investigation—some operate with only a medical examiner system, while others operate on a mixed coroner–medical examiner system. In the U.S., the terms "coroner" and "medical examiner" vary widely in meaning by jurisdiction, as do qualifications and duties for these offices. Advocates have promoted the medical examiner model as more accurate given the more stringent qualifications.

Local laws define the deaths a coroner must investigate. The most often legally required investigation is for sudden or unexpected deaths, in addition to deaths where no attending physician was present. Additionally, the law often requires investigations for deaths that are suspicious (as defined by jurisdiction) or violent. In several states across the U.S., the coroner has the authority to arrest the county sheriff or assume their duties under certain circumstances. For example, in Indiana, Colorado, Idaho, Kentucky, Ohio, Alabama, and North Carolina, statutes grant coroners these powers, serving as a check on the sheriff's authority. In Ohio, the coroner can assume the sheriff’s duties if the sheriff is incapacitated or otherwise unable to act.

==== Duties ====
Duties always include determining the cause, time and manner of death. The coroner/ME typically uses the same investigatory skills of a police detective because the answers are available from the circumstances, scene, and recent medical records. Many American jurisdictions require that any death not certified by an attending physician be referred to the medical examiner for the location where the death occurred. Only a small percentage of deaths require an autopsy to determine the time, cause and manner of death.

In some states, coroners have additional authority. For example:

- In Louisiana, coroners are involved in the determination of mental illness of living persons.
- In Colorado, the coroner has the same powers as a county sheriff to execute arrest warrants and to serve process, and is the only county official empowered to arrest the county sheriff; in certain situations where there is no sheriff, the coroner officially acts as sheriff for the county.
- In Kentucky, section 72.415 of the Kentucky Revised Statutes gives coroners and their deputies the full power and authority of peace officers. This includes the power of arrest and the authority to carry firearms.
- In North Carolina, the coroner exists by law in approximately 65 counties, but the office is active in only ten of them; in the counties that have coroners, they are set forth as common law peace officers, yet the coroner of the county also has judicial powers: to investigate cause and manner of death, as in other states, but also to conduct inquests, to issue court orders, to impanel a coroner's jury and to act as sheriff in certain cases. She can arrest the sheriff for cause. Beginning in 2015, the NC Office of Chief Medical Examiner (OCME) began optional training for coroners to become special assistant medical examiner investigators (NC CH130A & 152).
- In Indiana, the coroner is the only law enforcement officer who has the authority to arrest and incarcerate the county sheriff and take command of the county jail. The coroner is also the only official who may serve the sheriff with civil process.
- In New York City, the office of coroner was abolished in 1915, since before that time, having medical knowledge was not actually a requirement, leading to much abuse of the position.
- In California, 48 of the 58 counties have merged the county sheriff's office and the county coroner's office. In these counties, the sheriff also serves as the coroner.
- In Idaho, a coroner can arrest their local sheriff, via Idaho Code Sections 31-2217 and 31-2220, which were enacted in 1863. These laws were enacted, even before Idaho gained statehood.

== Notable examples ==
- Wynne Edwin Baxter
- Larry Campbell, former provincial coroner for British Columbia
- Athelstan Braxton Hicks, late 19th-century coroner in London and Surrey
- Thomas Noguchi (born 1927), former Chief Medical Examiner-Coroner for the County of Los Angeles
- Charles Norris
- Paul Revere, coroner for Boston
- Morton Shulman, former provincial coroner for Ontario
- William Wynn Westcott

== Artistic depictions ==
=== Film ===
- In the song "Ding-Dong! The Witch Is Dead", from the classic 1939 film The Wizard of Oz, the Coroner of Munchkinland confirms the death of the Wicked Witch of the East.

=== Literature ===
- M. R. Hall is a British crime novelist who writes a series of best-selling novels featuring Bristol-based coroner Jenny Cooper.
- Novelist Bernard Knight, a former Home Office pathologist and a professor of forensic pathology at the University of Wales College of Medicine, is well known for his Crowner John Mysteries series set in 12th-century Devon, England. (‘Crowner’ is an archaic word for ‘coroner’ and is based on the origins of the word. See the History section above.)

=== Television ===
Although coroners are often depicted in police dramas as a source of information for detectives, there are a number of fictional coroners who have taken particular focus on television.

- Dr. Camille Saroyan is a federal coroner and the head of the Forensic Division at Jeffersonian Institute in the TV series Bones.
- British television drama series The Coroner has as its main character a coroner based in a fictional Devon town.
- Crossing Jordan features Jill Hennessy as Jordan Cavanaugh, M.D., a crime-solving forensic pathologist employed in the Massachusetts Office of the Chief Medical Examiner.
- The coroners are significant characters and main cast members on CSI: Crime Scene Investigation and its spin-offs CSI: Miami and CSI: NY.
- The television series Da Vinci's Inquest has a coroner as its title character.
- The American police procedural drama series Hawaii Five-0 features a coroner named Dr. Max Bergman, played by Japanese-American actor Masi Oka.
- Kujo Kiriya from the 2016 Japanese TV series Kamen Rider Ex-Aid is a coroner.
- In Law & Order: Special Victims Unit, the detectives are regularly assisted by coroner Melinda Warner.
- Kurt Fuller plays Woody, a coroner on the American detective comedy-drama Psych.
- The television series Quincy, M.E. has the title character (a medical examiner) under the authority of the county coroner.
- The television series Wojeck (the Canadian ancestor of Quincy, M.E.) has a coroner as its title character, inspired by the coroner Morton Shulman.

== See also ==
- Ontario Centre of Forensic Sciences – home to the Coroner's Office for Ontario
