= Thomas Herbert Pigot =

English barrister and judge

His Honour Thomas Pigot QC

Common Serjeant of London
- In office 1984–1990

Thomas Herbert Pigot, QC (19 May 1921 – 10 September 1998) was an English barrister and judge. He was Common Serjeant of London from 1984 to 1990.

Born in Wigan in 1921, the son of a company secretary and of a teacher, Pigot was educated at Manchester Grammar School, where he was a scholar, and Brasenose College, Oxford, where he was a Somerset scholar and took first-class honours in jurisprudence. During the Second World War, after training at Sandhurst, he was commissioned into the Welch Regiment, before transferring to the Royal Lincolnshire Regiment. He saw action in North Africa, and was wounded and taken prisoner by the Italians in 1943 in Tunisia.
