= Brian Barker =

British jurist

His Honour Judge Brian Barker CBE KC
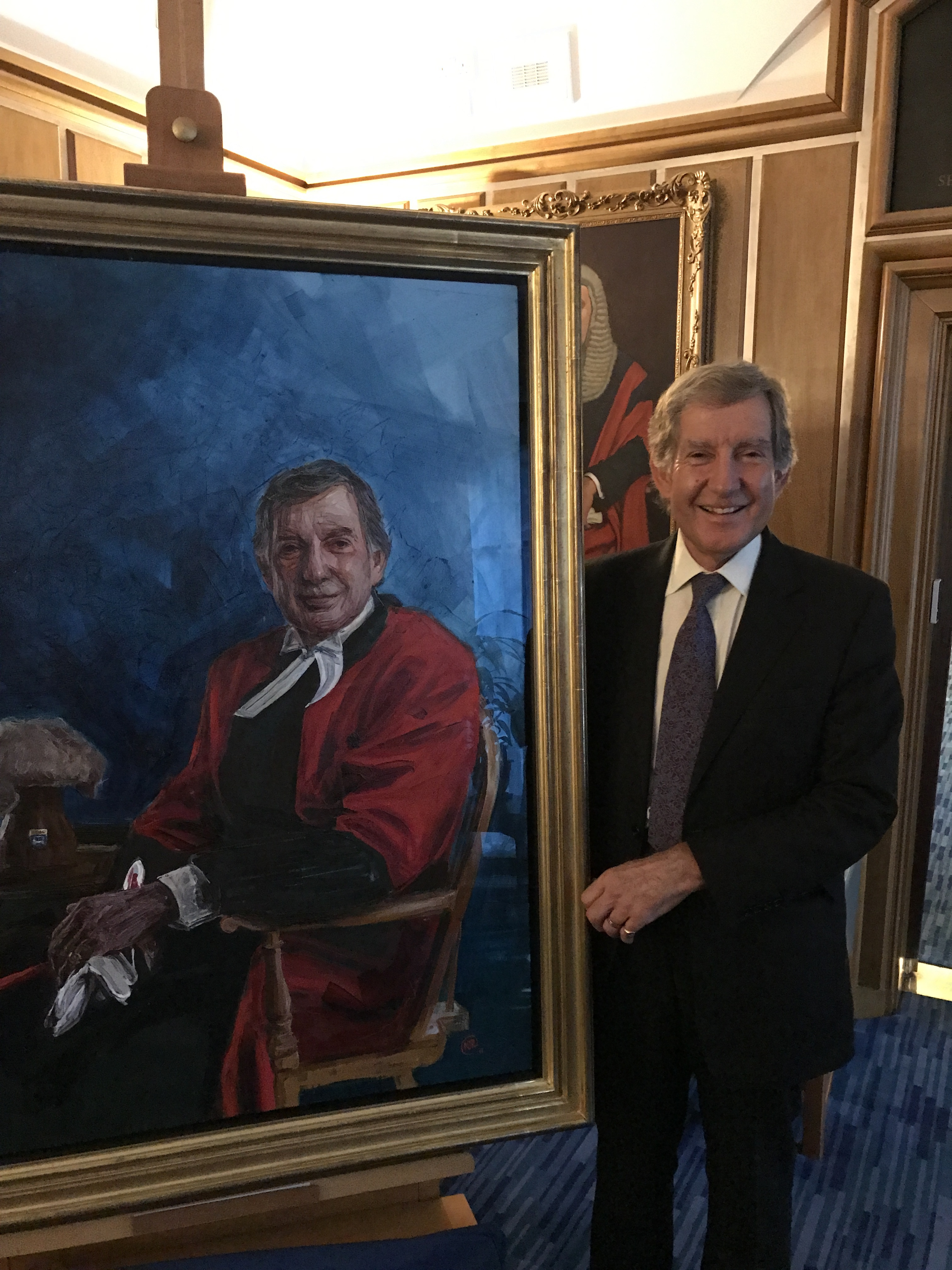
- HHJ Brian Barker unveiling his portrait at the Old Bailey, London, 2017

Recorder of London
- In office 2013–2015
- Preceded by: Peter Beaumont
- Succeeded by: Nicholas Hilliard

Brian John Barker CBE KC (born 1945), is a British jurist. From February 2013 to January 2015 he served as the Recorder of London, the most senior judge at the Old Bailey. Prior to that he was the Common Serjeant of London, the second most senior judge at the Old Bailey.

Barker graduated from Birmingham University with an LLB degree in law in 1966. He was called to the Bar by Gray's Inn in 1969, and was a leading criminal barrister, acting as a prosecutor and a defender. He served as chairman of the Criminal Bar Association. He was appointed Queen's Counsel in 1990, and was appointed a circuit judge at the Old Bailey in 2000.

He succeeded Peter Beaumont as Recorder of London in February 2013, to become the most senior judge at the Old Bailey. Barker had previously served as the 79th Common Serjeant of London since 2005, the second most senior judge at the Old Bailey, again succeeding Judge Peter Beaumont QC. The Recorder of London and the Common Serjeant are both ancient offices, first recorded in the 13th century. At the Old Bailey Barker presided over trials including those of Umran Javed, the murderers of Jody Dobrowski, the murder trial of rapper 'Crazy Titch', aka Carl Dobson, and the murder of Ben Kinsella.

In May 2016, the Secretary of State for Northern Ireland Rt Hon. Theresa Villiers MP announced the appointment of Barker to the dual role of chairman of the Northern Ireland Committee on Protection and Independent Reviewer of National Security Arrangements in Northern Ireland.

In December 2016, the British Horseracing Authority (BHA) announced that, following an open competition, it had appointed Barker as its first judicial panel chairman.

In May 2017, Barker appeared as the judge in The Trial: A Murder in the Family on Channel 4.

Barker is married to Dame Anne Rafferty one of the United Kingdom's few female Appeal Court judges, with whom he has three daughters. Another daughter, who had Down syndrome, died aged two.

Barker is a Governor of Sir John Cass's Foundation, one of London's oldest and largest education charities, which was founded in 1748. Barker is a Freeman of the City of London, a Past Master of the Worshipful Company of Coopers an Honorary Liveryman of the Curriers' Company and an Honorary Tithingman of the Guildable Manor of Southwark.

Barker was appointed Commander of the Order of the British Empire (CBE) in the 2015 New Year Honours for services to the administration of justice and to charity.
