= David Tudor Price =

British judge (1931–1986)

Sir David William Tudor Price (29 January 1931 – 13 February 1986) was a British barrister and judge. He was educated at Rugby School and Magdalene College, Cambridge, and served as a High Court judge from 1984 until his death less than two years later. Before his appointment to the High Court bench, he had served as Common Serjeant of London from 1981 to 1984.
