= Chief Coroner of England and Wales =

The Chief Coroner of England and Wales is the most senior coroner in England and Wales, and supervises the work of other coroners in that jurisdiction.

The post was created by the Coroners and Justice Act 2009. The first Chief Coroner was appointed in 2010, though he did not take up his post until 2012. Previously there had been no national head of the coroner service.

The Chief Coroner is appointed by the Lord Chief Justice of England and Wales, in consultation with the Lord Chancellor. To be eligible for appointment, a person must be either a judge of the High Court or a circuit judge and be under the age of 75.

== Post holders ==
Since 2009, four people have held the position:

- 2012 – 2016: Peter Thornton KC
- 2016 – 2020: Mark Lucraft KC
- 2020 – 2024: Thomas Teague KC
- 2024 – Incumbent: Alexia Durran

All four holders of the office were circuit judges sitting in the Crown Court at the time of their appointment.

== Deputy Chief Coroners ==
Two Deputy Chief Coroners were appointed in January 2019: Derek Winter, the Senior Coroner for the Sunderland Coroner Area, and Alexia Durran, a senior circuit judge.
