= Peter Beaumont (judge) =

British barrister and judge

His Honour Peter Beaumont CBE, KC

Recorder of London
- In office 2004–2013
- Preceded by: Michael Hyam
- Succeeded by: Brian Barker

Common Serjeant of London
- In office 2001–2004

Peter Beaumont CBE KC (born 10 January 1944) is a British barrister and retired judge.

Beaumont was called to the Bar at Lincoln's Inn in 1967 where he later became a Bencher in 2001. He took silk in 1986, and served as a Crown Court Recorder from 1986 to 1989, before becoming a circuit judge. Beaumont had previously sat at the Central Criminal Court (better known as the Old Bailey) since 1995, and was Common Serjeant of London from 2001 to 2004, being appointed Recorder of London in December 2004, following the sudden death of the previous Recorder, Judge Michael Hyam QC. During his time as a senior Judge at the Central Criminal Court Beaumont made some controversial rulings.

Beaumont retired from the judiciary in February 2013 and was succeeded as Recorder of London by Brian Barker.

== Awards and honours ==
Beaumont was appointed Commander of the Order of the British Empire (CBE) in the 2013 New Years Honours.
