= Eustace Hart =

Indian-born English cricketer

Personal information
- Full name: Eustace John Hewitt Hart
- Born: 14 November 1907; Poona, British India
- Died: 4 February 1972 (aged 64); Bath, Somerset, England
- Batting: Right-handed
- Role: Batsman

Domestic team information
- Years: Team
- 1930: Somerset
- FC debut: 7 May 1930 Somerset v Kent
- Last FC: 14 May 1930 Somerset v Warwickshire

Career statistics
Competition	First-class
Matches	3
Runs scored	45
Batting average	9.00
100s/50s	0/0
Top score	16
Catches/stumpings	1/–
- Source: CricketArchive, 28 October 2010

Eustace John Hewitt Hart (14 November 1907 – 4 February 1972) played first-class cricket for Somerset in three matches in the 1930 season. He was born at Pune, India, and died at Swainswick, Bath, Somerset.

Hart played as a right-handed lower middle order batsman in his three games for Somerset at the start of the 1930 season. In his first innings, in the match against Warwickshire at Edgbaston he was second highest scorer with 16 out of a total of just 89. But this proved to be the highest score of his career and after two further games, he dropped out of the team and did not play first-class cricket again.

By profession, he was a chartered accountant and was a partner for a firm in Bristol; he played club cricket for Bath Cricket Club.
