= Richard Martin (Recorder of London) =

English lawyer, orator, and supporter of the Virginia Company

Richard Martin Esq.
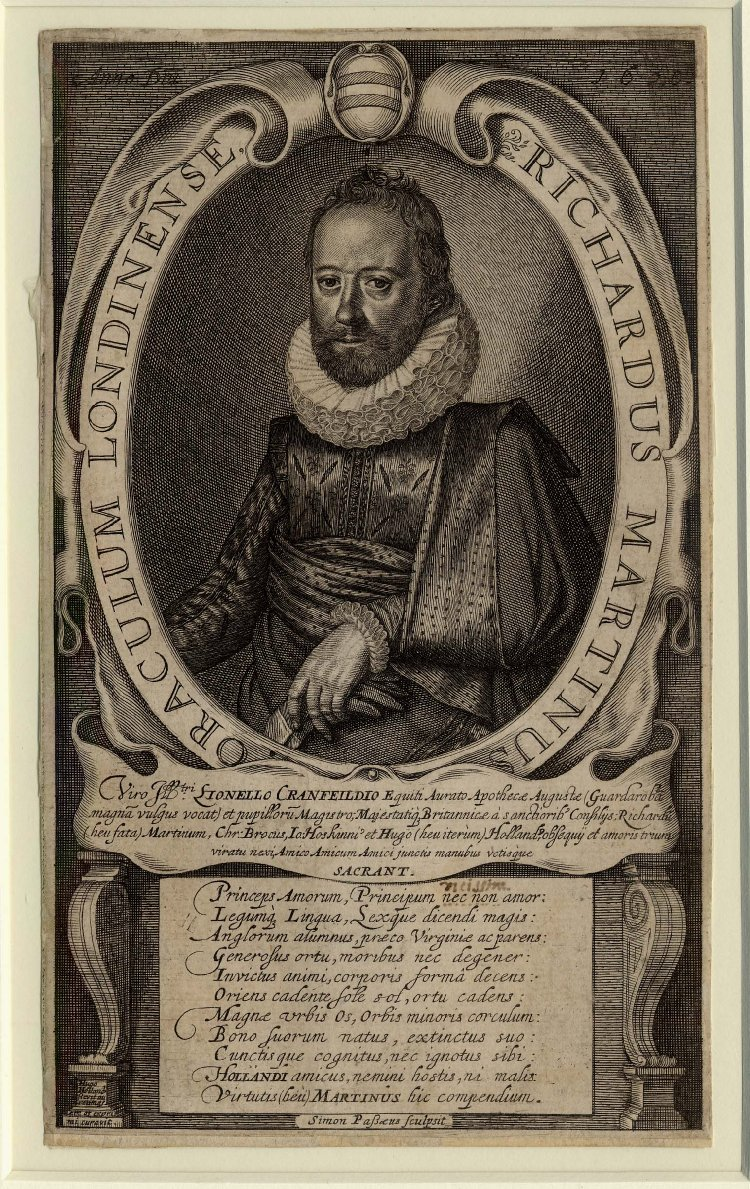
- Richard Martin, 1620, by Simon de Passe.
- Born: 1570
- Died: 1618 (aged 47–48)
- Occupations: English lawyer and politician

Richard Martin (1570–1618) was an English lawyer, orator, and supporter of the Virginia Company who was appointed Recorder of the City of London at the recommendation of James I of England in 1618 but died shortly thereafter.

== Lawyer and tavern wit ==
Martin studied at Oxford University and was admitted to the Middle Temple, one of the Inns of Court providing legal training in Elizabethan London, on 7 November 1587. He was a member of a group of intellectual men, poets, and playwrights including John Donne and Ben Jonson who met the first Friday of every month at the Mermaid Tavern in Bread Street. Martin was "universally well regarded for his warmth of nature, personal beauty, and graceful speech", and was elected "prince of Love" to preside over the Christmas grand revels of the Middle Temple in the winter of 1597/98. Michelle O'Callaghan points out that those elected to oversee the grand revels had to be skilled in "singing, dancing, and music", and well-versed in "rhetoric, law and other scholastic exercises travestied" in the revels. The poet John Davies dedicated his 1596 collection "Orchestra, or a Poeme of Dauncing" to Martin, but they fell out soon after, and Davies was disbarred and briefly thrown in the Tower of London in February 1598 "for thrashing his friend, another roysterer of the day, Mr. Richard Martin, in the Middle Temple Hall" with a cudgel. (Davies publicly apologized to Martin in 1601 and was readmitted to the English Bar. He went on to have a brilliant legal career.)

Martin defended Jonson and his controversial 1602 play "The Poetaster" to the Lord Chief Justice Sir John Popham. Later, Jonson acknowledged Martin in the dedication of the 1616 folio edition of "The Poetaster" "for whose innocence, as for the author's you were once a noble and kindly undertaker to the greatest justice [Popham] of this kingdom."

Martin is mentioned in, and was perhaps a co-author of, the poetic libel "The Parliament Fart", one of the most popular and malleable comic poems of the early Stuart era, which originated in the circle of tavern wits of which Martin was a part.

== Parliament and the Virginia Company ==
Martin was elected member of Parliament for Barnstaple in 1601. Following the death of Queen Elizabeth in 1603, Martin was chosen to give a speech welcoming the new King James to London on behalf of the Sheriffs of London and Middlesex as part of the celebrations of the royal entry on 7 May. In his speech, Martin reminded the king of the breadth of his new kingdom and warned of the dangers of piracy. The speech was printed that same year.

Martin was M.P. for Christchurch in James's first Parliament (1604–11) and Counsel to the Virginia Company from 1612. Martin wrote of his passion for the American plantation as "a fire that doth not only burn in me, but flames out to the view of everyone".

In February 1613, with Edward Phelips, he helped produce The Memorable Masque of the Middle Temple and Lincoln's Inn at Whitehall Palace for the wedding of Princess Elizabeth and Frederick V of the Palatinate. The masque represented Virginian peoples on the stage, and introduced the theme of gold mining from Guiana. At the banquet afterwards, King James thanked Martin and Phelips as the "chief dooers and undertakers". The masque was a vehicle to promote the Virginia Company to an aristocratic audience.

In May 1614, Martin was invited to speak before the Addled Parliament on the Colony of Virginia as lawyer for the company. From 1611, Martin had taken an active interest in the colonization of the Bermuda Islands or Somers Isles, and in 1615 was a founding shareholder of the Somers Isles Company chartered to manage the colony.

On the death of Sir Anthony Benn, 29 September 1618, King James recommended Martin to the City of London for their recorder or chief counsel to the Lord Mayor, and he was chosen to the position, but died about a month after, of smallpox, on Sunday morning 2 November 1618, and was buried in the Temple Church, London.

In 1617, when the treasury of the Virginia Company was exhausted, societies of private adventurers were authorized to settle plantations in Virginia under the style of "hundreds." One of the first of these societies, organized in 1618 as the Society of Martin's Hundred, was named in honour of Richard Martin who had so eloquently defended Virginia before Parliament in 1614. Martin's Hundred, containing some 80,000 acres (320 km^{2}), was about seven miles (11 km) below Jamestown, Virginia, on the north side of the James River.
