= Recorder of London =

Legal adviser at the Criminal Court in the City of London

The recorder of London is an ancient legal office in the City of London. The recorder of London is the senior circuit judge at the Central Criminal Court (the Old Bailey), hearing trials of criminal offences. The recorder is appointed by the Crown on the recommendation of the City of London Corporation with the concurrence of the Lord Chancellor. The recorder's deputy is the Common Serjeant of London, appointed by the Crown on the recommendation of the Lord Chancellor. Since 14 April 2020, the Recorder of London has been Mark Lucraft.

== Background ==
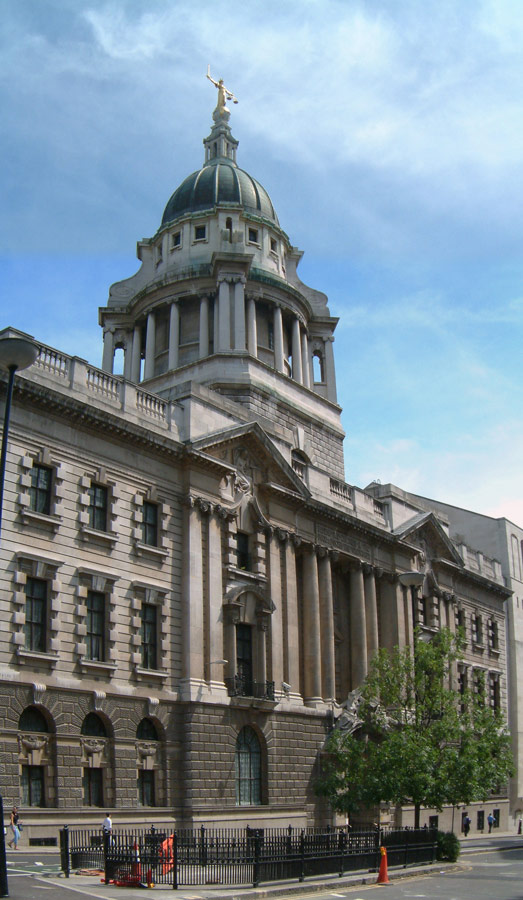
The Central Criminal Court, commonly called the Old Bailey after the street which it fronts.

The first recorder of London was appointed in 1298. Originally it seems likely that the recorder would have recorded pleas in the court of the Lord Mayor and the aldermen and delivered their judgments. A charter granted by Henry VI in 1444 appointed the recorder ex officio a conservator of the peace. The recorder increasingly exercised judicial functions thereafter, eventually becoming the principal judge in the City of London.

The recorder became a judge at the Central Criminal Court when it was created by Parliament in 1834. The Central Criminal Court became part of the Crown Court under the Courts Act 1971, but the recorder maintained his position when the office of recorder in other cities became honorary.

== Functions ==
In addition to hearing criminal trials at the Central Criminal Court, the recorder of London heads up court list management (including allocation of cases) to the court's judges. The recorder also provides legal advice to the Lord Mayor and the Court of Aldermen. Historically, the Recorder would present a list of 'Capital Convicts', those sentenced to death to the 'Hanging Cabinet' constituting the monarch, Home Secretary and other ministers, but this function was stopped between 1837 and the end of the death penalty.

The recorder has a traditional dress and takes charge of the election of the Lord Mayor of London, declares the result, and physically presents the new Lord Mayor for the monarch's approval, first to the Lord Chancellor, and then to the Lord Chief Justice and the Master of the Rolls (at the Royal Courts of Justice on the day of the Lord Mayor's Show). On the occasion of a state visit, the recorder usually presents an Address of Welcome on behalf of the City.

The recorder of London is the returning officer at the election of the verderers of Epping Forest, and is usually appointed High Steward of Southwark, appointed by the Court of Aldermen, holding the sitting of the three courts leet of the City's (largely ceremonial) manors there each year.

The recorder can act as the deputy of the Common Serjeant in the election of the Sheriff and their presentation to the King's Remembrancer at the Quit Rents ceremony.

== List of recorders of London ==
(before 1495 may not be complete)

- 1298 – (or John) Geoffrey de Norton
- 1303 – John de Wengrave (later Lord Mayor)
- 1321 – Jeffrey de Hertpoll (or Hertpole)
- 1321 – Robert de Swalchyne (or Robert de Swalclyve)
- 1329 – Gregory de Norton
- 1339 – Roger de Depham
- 1353 – Thomas Ludlow (later Chief Baron)
- 1365 – William de Halden
- 1377 – William Cheyne (perhaps later Chief Justice of the King's Bench)
- 1389 – John Tremayne
- 1392 – William Makenade
- 1394 – John Cokayne
- 1398 – Matthew de Sulhworth
- 1403 – Thomas Thornburgh
- 1405 – John Preston
- 1415 – John Barton
- 1422 – John Fray (later Chief Baron)
- 1426 – John Simonds
- 1435 – Alexander Anne
- 1440 – Thomas Cockayn
- 1440 – William (alias John) Bowes (also Speaker)
- 1442 – Robert Danvers
- 1451 – Thomas Billing (later Chief Justice of the King's Bench)
- 1455 – Thomas Urswick (later Chief Baron)
- 1471 – Sir Humphrey Starkey (later Chief Baron)
- 1483 – Thomas Fitzwilliam (later Speaker of the House of Commons)
- 1495–1508 – Sir Robert Sheffield
- 1508–1518 – John Chalyner
- 1518–1520 – Richard Broke (later also Justice of Common Pleas and Chief Baron)
- 1520–1526 – William Shelley (later Justice of Common Pleas)
- 1526–1536 – John Baker
- 1536–1546 – Sir Roger Cholmeley (later Chief Justice of the King's Bench)
- 1546–1553 – Robert Broke (later Justice of the Common Pleas, also Speaker)
- 1553–1563 – Ralph Cholmley (later Chief Justice of the Common Pleas)
- 1563–1566 – Richard Onslow
- 1566–1569 – Sir Thomas Bromley (later Lord Chancellor)
- 1569–1571 – Thomas Wilbraham (later a judge of the Court of Wards and Liveries)
- 1571–1591 – William Fleetwood
- 1591–1592 – Edward Coke (later Chief Justice of the Common Pleas and then Chief Justice of the King's Bench)
- 1592–1594 – Edward Drew
- 1594–1595 – Thomas Fleming
- 1595–1603 – John Croke (also Speaker of the House of Commons in 1601)
- 1603–1616 – Henry Montagu (later Chief Justice of the King's Bench)
- 1616 – Thomas Coventry
- 1616–1618 – Sir Anthony Benn
- 1618 – Richard Martin
- 1618–1620 – Robert Heath
- 1620 – Robert Shute
- 1620–1631 – Sir Heneage Finch (also Speaker of the House of Commons)
- 1631–1634 – Edward Littleton
- 1634–1635 – Robert Mason
- 1635 – Sir Henry Calthorpe
- 1635–1643 – Thomas Gardiner
- 1643 – Peter Phesant
- 1643–1649 – Sir John Glynn (previously Recorder of Westminster)
- 1649–1655 – William Steele (later Chief Baron of the Exchequer and then Lord Chancellor of Ireland)
- 1655–1658 – Lislebone Long
- 1658–1659 – John Green
- 1659–1668 – William Wilde (later Justice of the Common Pleas and then Justice of the King's Bench)
- 1668–1676 – John Howell
- 1676–1678 – Sir William Dolben (later Justice of the King's Bench)
- 1678–1680 – Sir George Jeffreys (later Chief Justice of the King's Bench)
- 1680–1683 – George Treby (displaced after the City of London's charters were suspended in 1683 under the Quo Warranto proceedings; restored in 1692, but then Chief Justice of the Common Pleas)
- 1683–1685 – Sir Thomas Jenner (later Baron of the Exchequer)
- 1685–1687 – Sir John Holt (later Lord Chief Justice)
- 1687–1688 – Sir John Tate
- 1688–1692 – Bartholomew Shower
- 1692–1708 – Salathiel Lovell (later Justice of the Common Pleas and Baron of the Exchequer)
- 1708–1714 – Sir Peter King (later Chief Justice of Common Pleas)
- 1714–1739 – Sir William Thompson (later Baron of the Exchequer)
- 1739–1742 – Sir John Strange
- 1742–1743 – Simon Urlin
- 1743–1749 – John Stracey
- 1749–1753 – Sir Richard Adams (later Baron of the Exchequer)
- 1753–1763 – Sir William Moreton
- 1763–1772 – Sir James Eyre (later Chief Baron of the Exchequer, and Chief Justice of the Common Pleas)
- 1772–1779 – John Glynn
- 1779–1789 – James Adair
- 1789–1803 – Sir John William Rose
- 1803–1822 – Sir John Silvester, Bt
- 1822–1833 – Newman Knowlys
- 1833–1850 – Charles Ewan Law
- 1850–1856 – James Stuart-Wortley, MP
- 1856–1878 – Russell Gurney
- 1878–1891 – Thomas Chambers
- 1892–1900 – Charles Hall
- 1900–1922 – Sir Forrest Fulton
- 1922–1934 – Sir Ernest Wild
- 1934–1937 – Henry Holman Gregory
- 1937–1959 – Sir Gerald Dodson
- 1959–1964 – Edward Anthony Hawke
- 1964–1975 – Sir Carl Aarvold
- 1975–1990 – Sir James Miskin
- 1990–1998 – Sir Lawrence Verney
- 1998–2004 – Michael Hyam
- 2004–2013 – Peter Beaumont
- 2013–2015 – Brian Barker
- 2015–2019 – Nicholas Hilliard
- 2020–present – Mark Lucraft
