= Old Bailey =

Criminal court building in London, England

Central Criminal Court of England and Wales
- Old Bailey
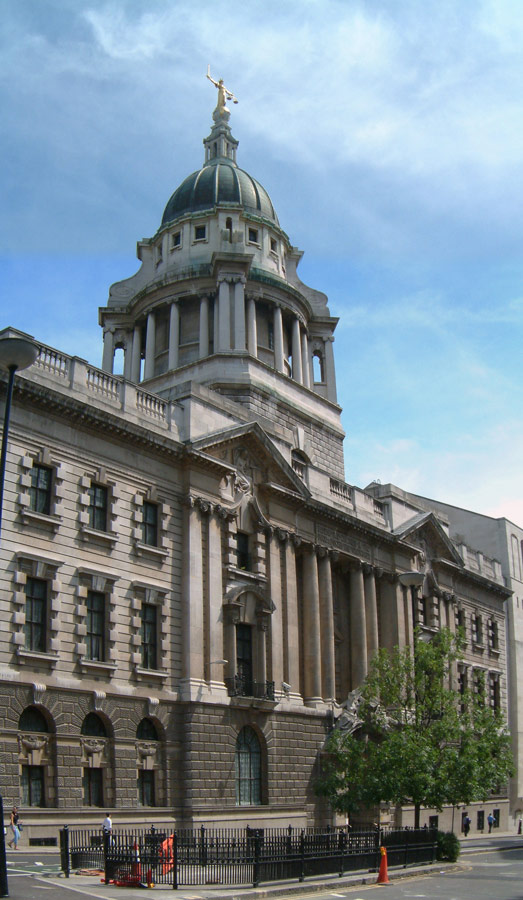
- The Old Bailey in 2004
- Interactive map of Central Criminal Court of England and Wales
- 51°30′57″N 0°6′6.5″W
- Jurisdiction: England and Wales
- Location: London EC4
- Coordinates: 51°30′57″N 0°6′6.5″W

Recorder of London
- Currently: Mark Lucraft
- Since: 14 April 2020

The Central Criminal Court of England and Wales, commonly referred to as the Old Bailey after the street on which it stands, is a criminal court building in the City of London, one of several that house the Crown Court of England and Wales.

The street outside follows the route of the ancient wall around London, which was part of the fortification's bailey; this likely gave it its name.

The court has been housed in a succession of buildings on the street since at least the sixteenth century, when it was attached to the medieval Newgate Prison. The current main building block was completed in 1902, designed by Edward William Mountford; its monumental architecture is recognised and protected as a Grade II* listed building. An extension, South Block, was constructed in 1972, over the former site of Newgate Prison which had been demolished in 1904.

The Crown Court sitting in the Old Bailey hears major criminal cases from within Greater London. In exceptional cases, trials may be referred to the Old Bailey from other parts of England and Wales. As with most courts in England and Wales, trials at the Old Bailey are open to the public, although they are subject to stringent security procedures.

== History ==
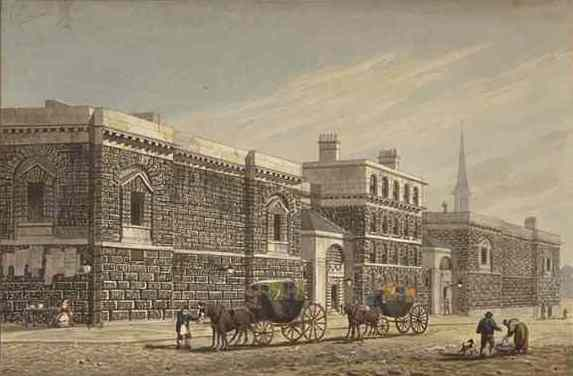
Newgate Prison in 1810. For much of its history, the "Old Baily" court (among other spellings seen) was attached to the gaol.

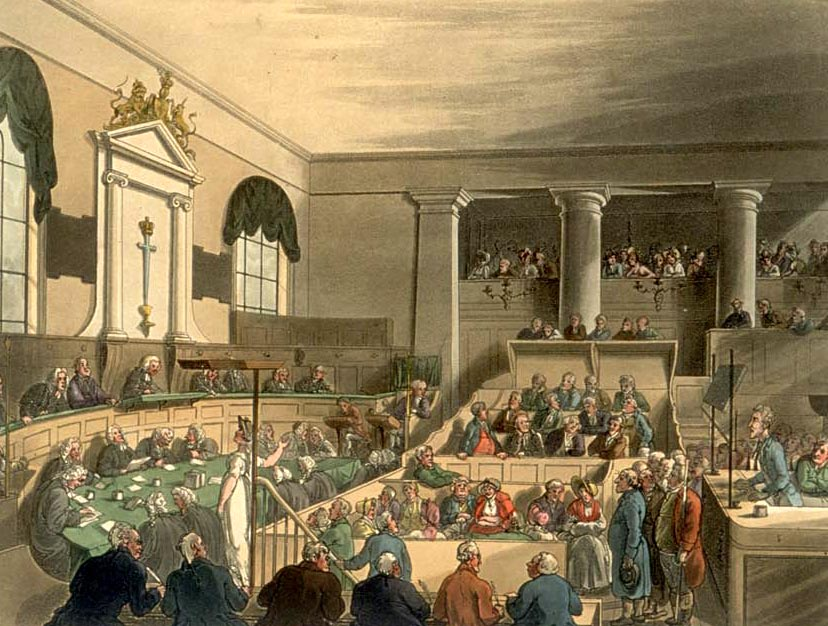
An Old Bailey trial, c. 1808

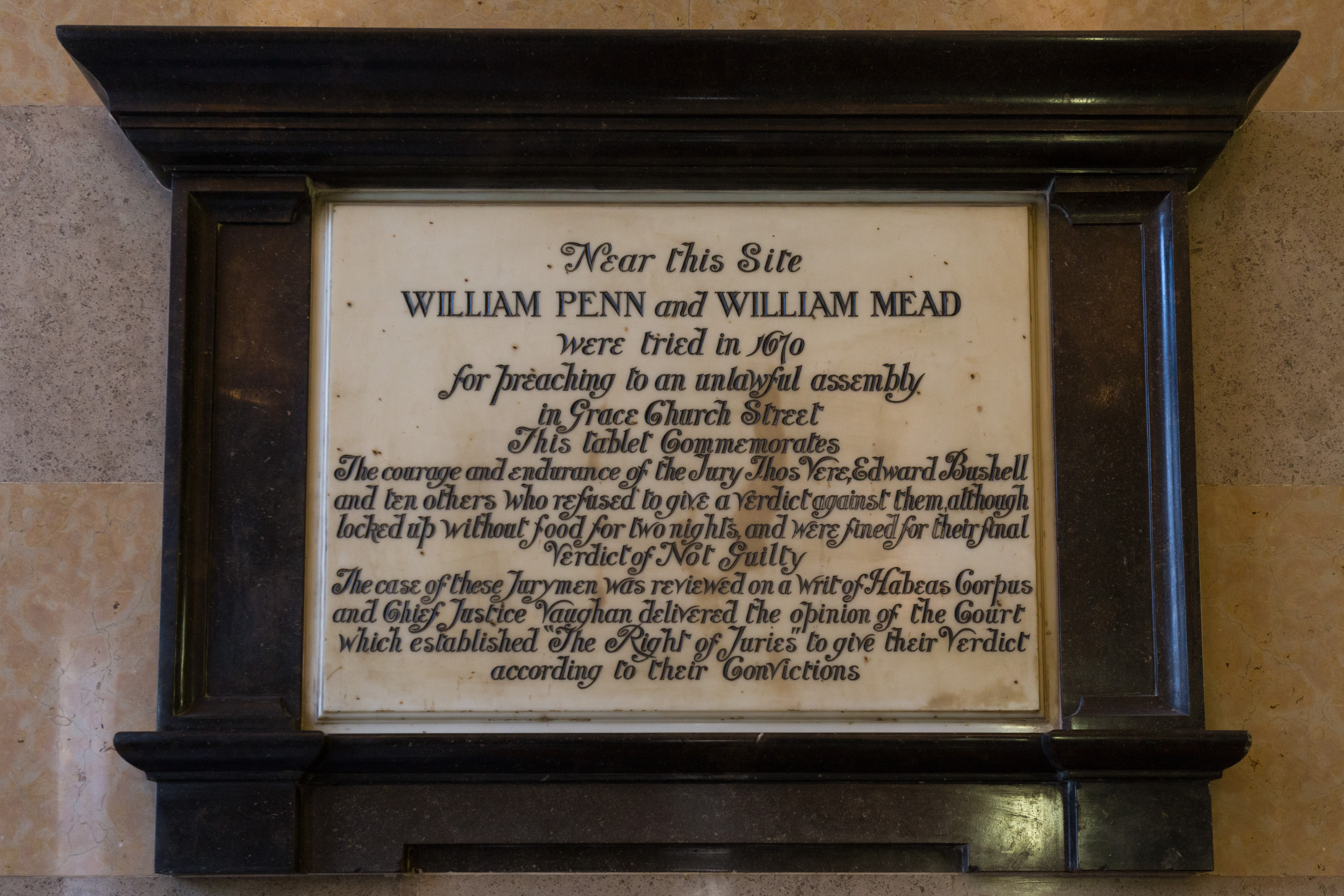
Plaque commemorating Bushel's Case of 1670

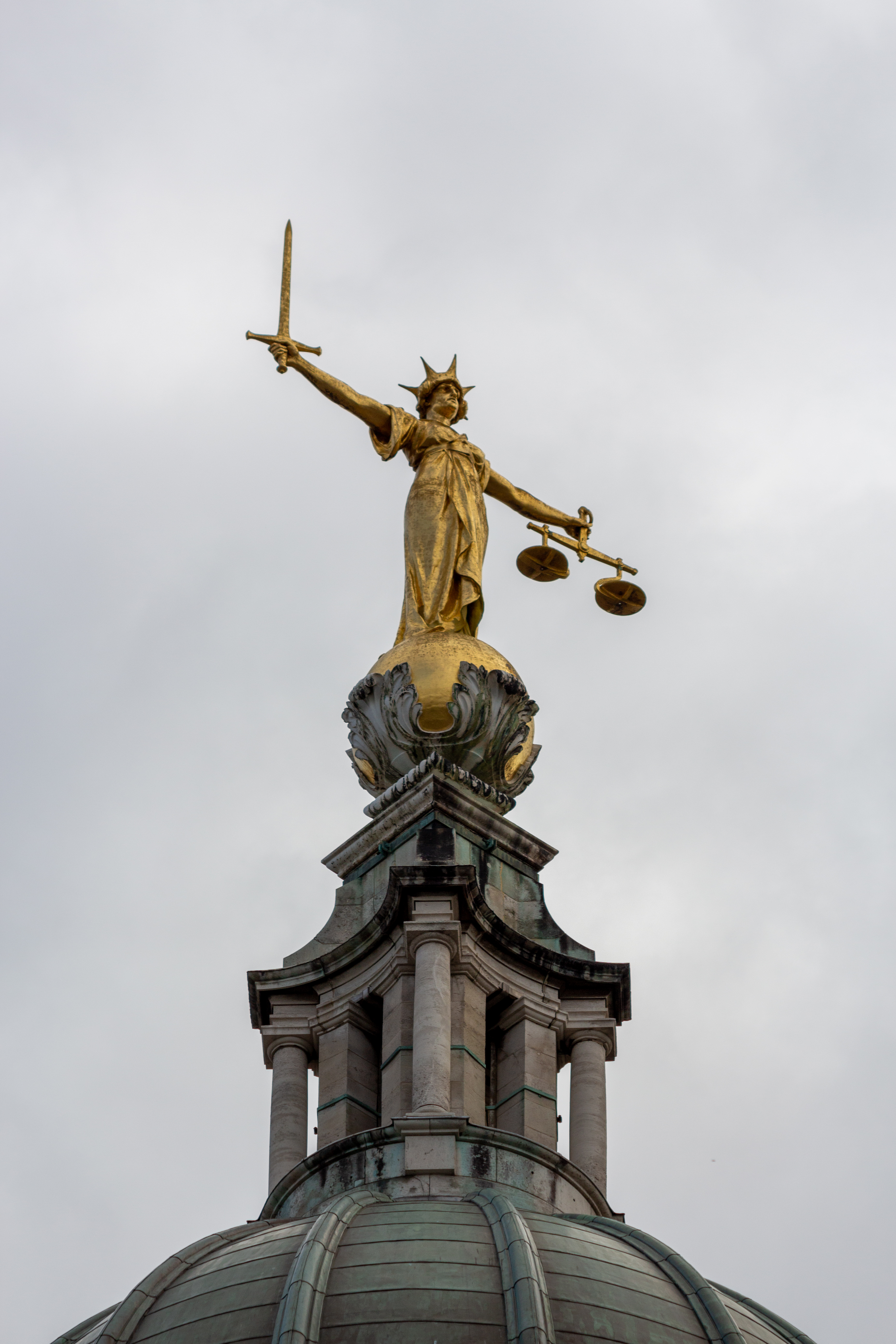
Lady Justice statue on the top of the court building

A small Sessions House at the time (in black at centre near red line), the court is shown in Christopher and John Greenwood's 8 inch-to-mile map published in 1827 from an 1830 republication.

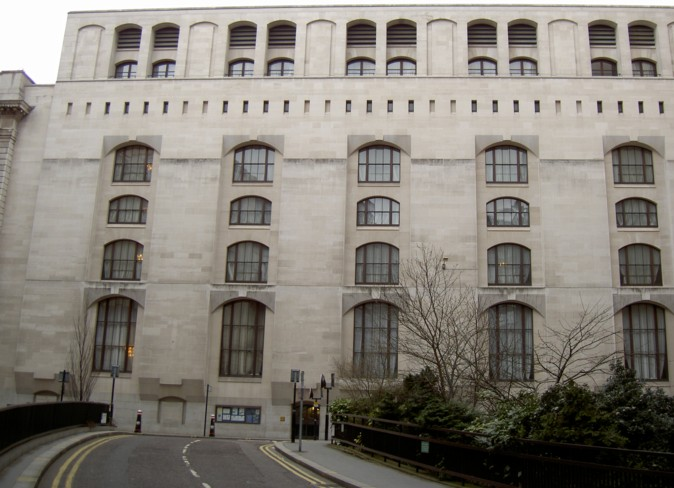
South Block extension

The court originated as the sessions house of the Lord Mayor and Sheriffs of the City of London and of Middlesex. In addition to sessions court, the Old Bailey also held trials, similar to the travelling Courts of Assize held in other parts of England and Wales. The original medieval court is first mentioned in 1585; it was next to the older Newgate Prison, and seems to have grown out of the endowment to improve the gaol and rooms for the sheriffs, made possible by a gift from 15th-century Lord Mayor Richard Whittington. It was destroyed in the Great Fire of London in 1666 and rebuilt in 1674, with the court open to the weather to prevent the spread of disease.

The building was re-fronted in 1734, so as to enclose the court and reduce the influence of spectators: this led to outbreaks of typhus, notably in 1750 when 60 people died, including the Lord Mayor Sir Samuel Pennant and two judges, Sir Thomas Abney and Charles Clarke. It was rebuilt again in 1774 and a second courtroom was added in 1824. Over 100,000 criminal trials were carried out at the Old Bailey between 1674 and 1834.

In 1834 a new court was created, the Central Criminal Court, with jurisdiction to try all crimes committed in London, Middlesex, certain parts of Essex, Kent, and Surrey, and also crimes committed on the high seas. The new court sat in the Old Bailey.

The court was envisaged as that where only criminals accused of crimes committed within its jurisdiction were tried. However, in 1856, there was public revulsion at complaints sent to police against doctor William Palmer that he was a poisoner and murderer. This led to fears that he could not receive a fair trial in his native Staffordshire. The Central Criminal Court Act 1856 was passed to enable his trial, and others with a public profile, to be held at the Old Bailey.

The Old Bailey adjoined Newgate Prison until the jail's 1902 closure. In London cant the court was sometimes called The Gate, an abbreviation of Newgate. Hangings were a public spectacle in the street outside until May 1868. The condemned would be led along Dead Man's Walk between the buildings, and many were buried in the walk itself. Large, rowdy crowds sometimes gathered and pelted the condemned with rotten fruit and vegetables and stones. Some sources claim that, after 28 people were crushed to death when a pie-seller's stall overturned, a tunnel was made between the prison and St Sepulchre's church opposite the crossroads, to allow the chaplain to minister to the condemned without having to force his way through crowds; but there are no known primary sources or photographic evidence that indicate that it actually existed.

The present building dates from 1902 and was officially opened by King Edward VII on 27 February 1907. It was designed by E. W. Mountford and co-occupies the site of the demolished prison. Above the main entrance is inscribed the admonition: "Defend the Children of the Poor & Punish the Wrongdoer".

On the dome above the court stands the court's symbolic gilt bronze statue of Lady Justice by sculptor F. W. Pomeroy (made 1905–1906). She holds a sword in her right hand and the scales of justice in her left. The statue is popularly supposed to show blind Justice, but the figure is not blindfolded: the courthouse brochures explain that this is because Lady Justice was originally not blindfolded, and because her "maidenly form" is supposed to guarantee her impartiality which renders the blindfold redundant.

During the Blitz of the Second World War, the Old Bailey was bombed and severely damaged, but reconstruction work restored most of it in the early 1950s. In 1952, the restored interior of the Grand or Great Hall of the Central Criminal Court was once again open. This hall (underneath the dome) is decorated with paintings commemorating the Blitz, as well as quasi-historical scenes of St Paul's Cathedral with nobles outside. Running around the entire hall are a series of axioms, some of biblical reference. They read:

"The law of the wise is a fountain of life"
"The welfare of the people is supreme"
"Right lives by law and law subsists by power"
"Poise the cause in justice's equal scales"
"Moses gave unto the people the laws of God"
"London shall have all its ancient rights"

Between 1968 and 1972, a new South Block, designed by the architects Donald McMorran and George Whitby, was built to accommodate more modern courts.

In 1973, the Belfast Brigade of the Provisional IRA exploded a car bomb in the street outside, killing one and injuring 200 people. A shard of glass is preserved as a reminder, embedded in the wall at the top of the main stairs.

The hall (and its floor) was decorated with many busts and statues, chiefly of British monarchs, but also of legal figures, and those who achieved renown by campaigning for improvement in prison conditions from 1700 to 1900. This part of the building also housed the stenographers' offices until the stenographers were replaced by technology in March 2012. On 7 February 2024, around 1,500 people were forced to evacuate the building following a fire and reports of five separate explosions at the rear of the Central Criminal Court. Defendants on remand were returned to prison and juries were sent home.

== Management ==
Until 2017, the court manager was known by the title of the Secondary of the City of London, an ancient title of a City officer. His Majesty's Courts and Tribunals Service manages the courts and administers the trials but the building itself is owned by the City of London Corporation, which finances the maintenance and running of the building and the staff costs out of their own resources.

== Judges ==
All judges sitting in the Old Bailey are addressed as "My Lord" or "My Lady", whether they are High Court, circuit judges or recorders. The Lord Mayor and aldermen of the City of London are entitled to sit on the judges' bench during a hearing but do not participate in hearings. Where a ceremonial tradition is followed, a judge, sitting solo, will sit off-centre in case the Lord Mayor should decide to come in, in which case they would take the centre chair. The most senior permanent judge of the Central Criminal Court has the title of Recorder of London, and their deputy has the title of Common Serjeant of London. The position of "Recorder of London" is distinct from that of a recorder, which is a part-time judicial office, holders of which sit part-time as judges of the Crown Court or County Court. The recent Recorders of London have been:

- 1975–1990 – Sir James Miskin
- 1990–1998 – Sir Lawrence Verney
- 1998–2004 – Michael Hyam
- 2004–2013 – Peter Beaumont
- 2013–2015 – Brian Barker
- 2015–2019 – Nicholas Hilliard
- 2020–present – Mark Lucraft

== Civic role ==
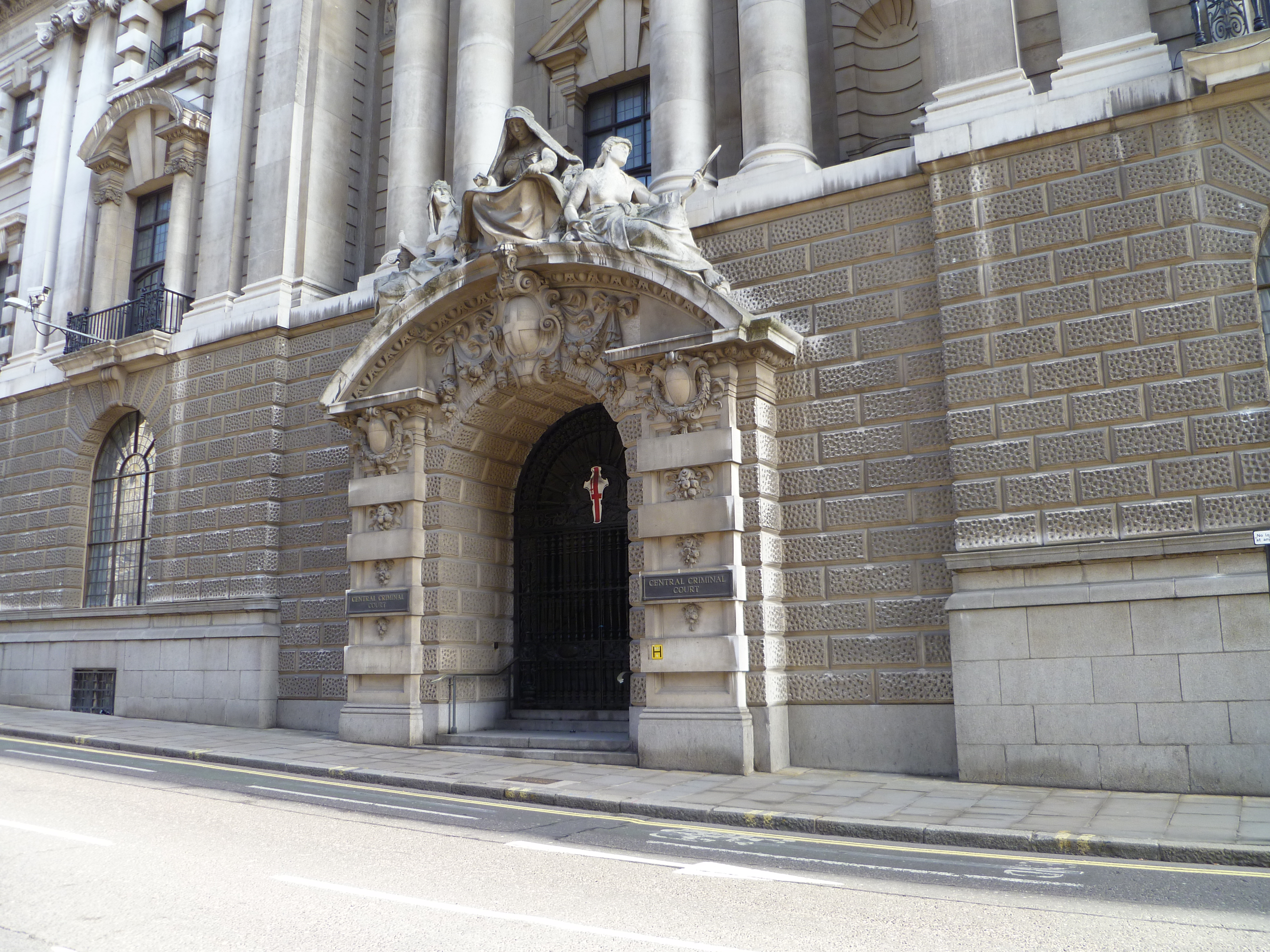
Entrance to the original block of the Old Bailey, now only used for ceremonial purposes

The court house originated as part of the City of London judicial system, and it remains so. The Recorder and the Common Serjeant are city officers, and the Recorder is a member of the Common Council because he is also a member of the Court of Aldermen. The city's sheriffs and the Lord Mayor are justices there, but their jurisdiction is now nominal. The sheriffs are resident with the senior judges in the complex. Court 1 has benches set aside for the committee of City Bridge Foundation, the owner of the building.

== In popular culture ==
The Old Bailey has been mentioned and featured in numerous works of fiction, including film, video games, and literature such as Charles Dickens's book, A Tale of Two Cities. Notable examples include V for Vendetta and its film adaptation, in which the title character demolishes it to gain the public's attention, and Justice League and its director's cut, in which Wonder Woman foils a terrorist bomb plot. In Agatha Christie's play Witness for the Prosecution, the murder trial of Leonard Vole is held at the Old Bailey. It is also a central location in The Great Ace Attorney: Adventures and its sequel, The Great Ace Attorney 2: Resolve, in which many of the trials in the games' plot take place. Rumpole of the Bailey is a British television series created and written by the British writer and barrister John Mortimer, in which Horace Rumpole, an elderly London barrister, defends a broad variety of clients, often underdogs. In The Pirates of Penzance, upon defeating the police, the pirates declare that "No pirate band will take its stand / At the Central Criminal Court."

== Gallery ==
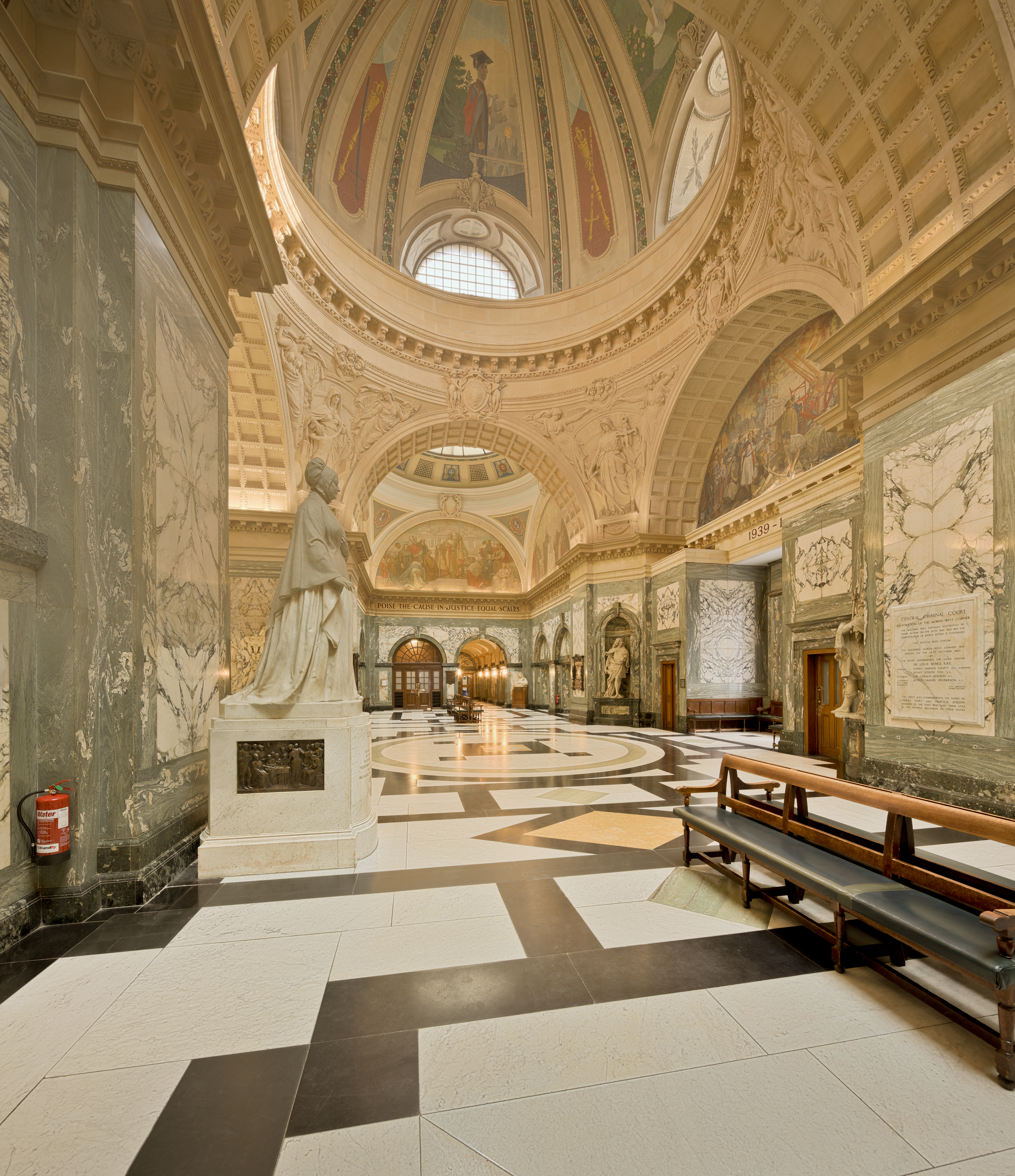
The Grand Hall

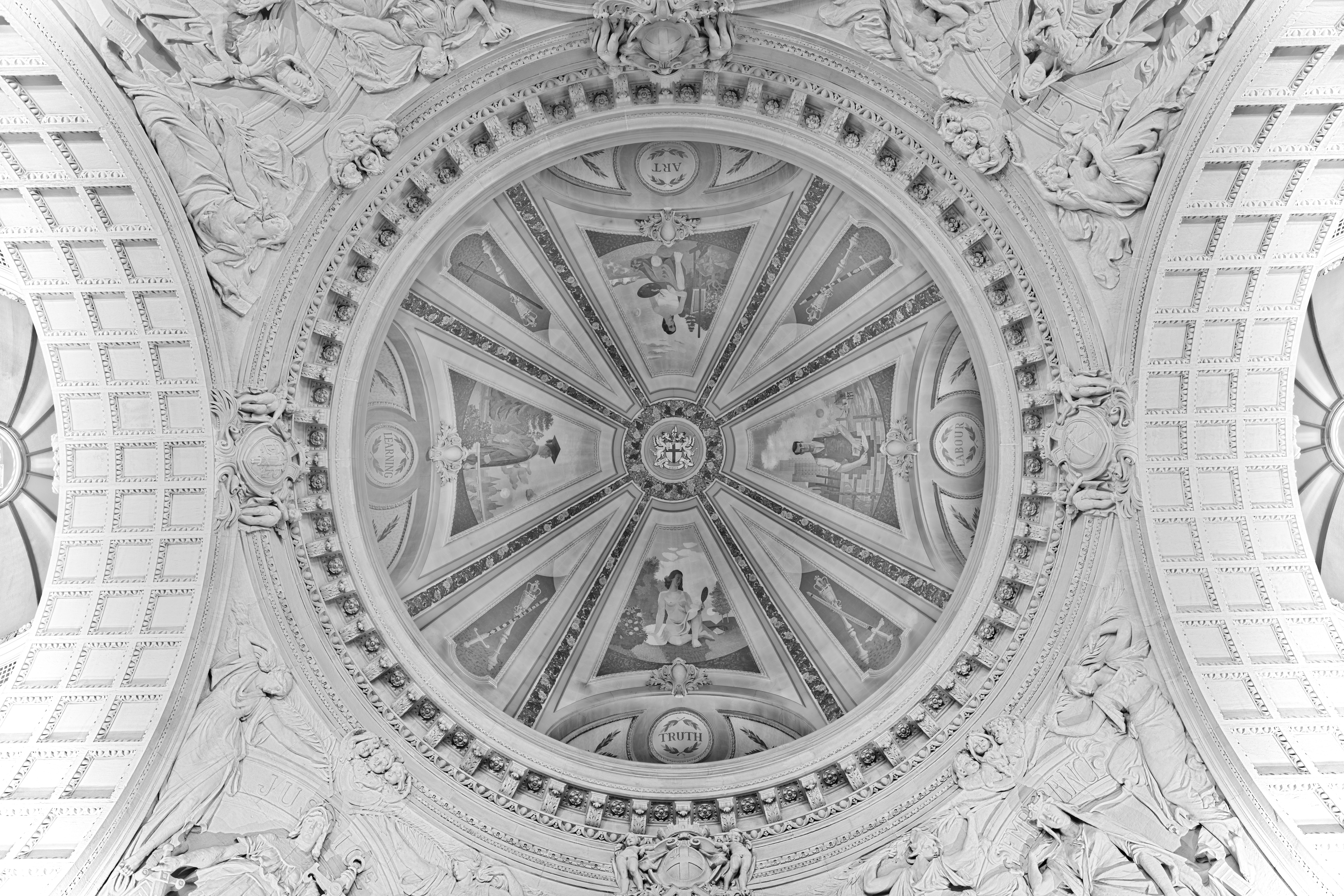
The Dome Ceiling

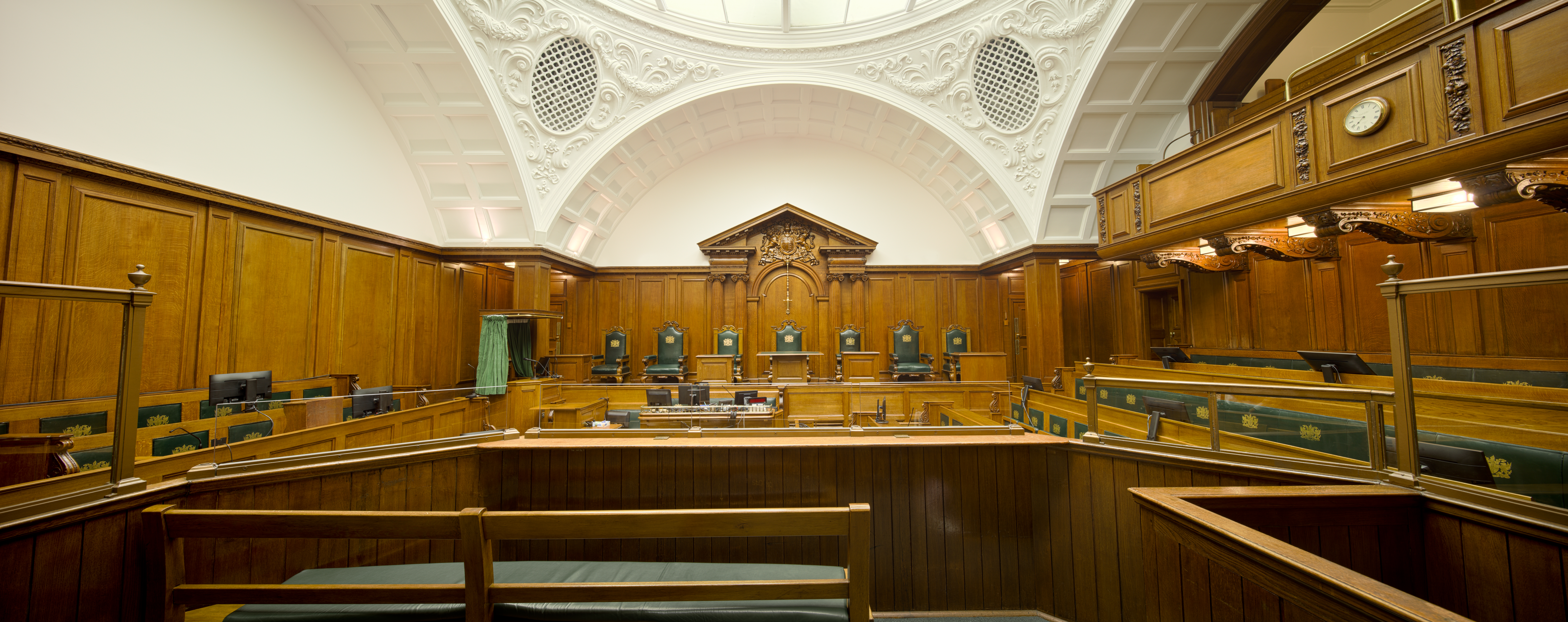
Looking from the dock in Court No 1

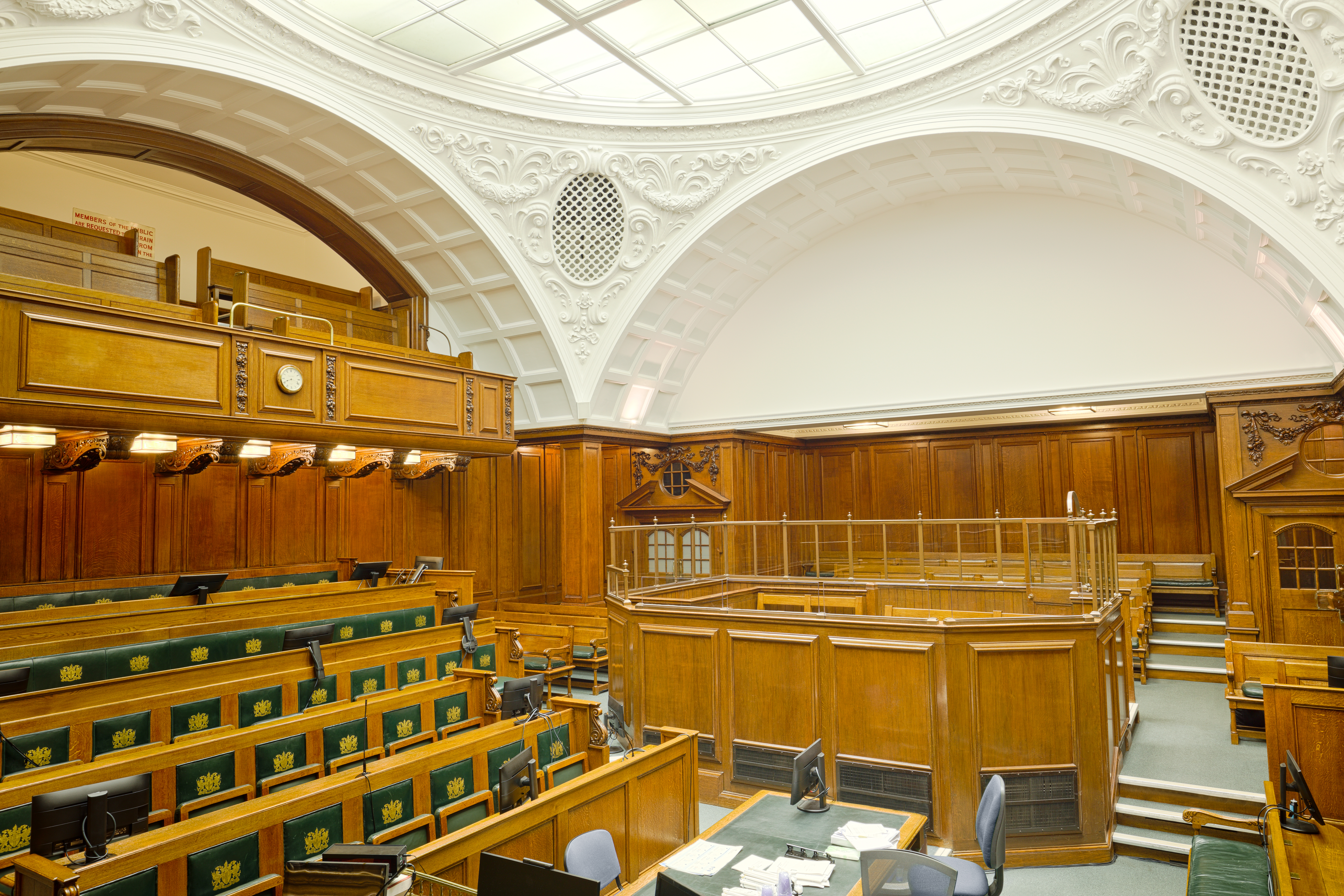
Looking at the dock in Court No 1

== See also ==
- Bow Street Magistrates' Court
- City of Westminster Magistrates' Court
- Courts of England and Wales
- Royal Courts of Justice
