= Andrew Havill =

British actor (born 1965)

- Born: 1 June 1965 (age 61); Oxford, England
- Education: University of Exeter
- Years active: 1989–present
- Website: Official website

Andrew Havill (born 1 June 1965) is a British actor. Havill has appeared in more than 40 films and 50 plays beginning in the late 1980s. After training in Oxford and London, he began his career in repertory theatre in 1989 and made his screen debut in 1993. As a character actor, Havill has appeared in many British costume dramas.

== Education ==
Havill attended the University of Exeter, where he read English and drama. He spent four years with the National Youth Theatre of Great Britain with roles in London theatre productions including For Those in Peril at the Shaw Theatre, As You Like It at the Open Air Theatre in Regent's Park, and Reynard the Fox on the Drum Theatre Plymouth and south-west tour. At the Jeanetta Cochrane Theatre, Havill appeared in Henry V, Twelfth Night, and A Proper Place. He spent a further four years with the Royal Shakespeare Company.

Havill is also an alumnus of the Oxford University Dramatic Society with roles in Oxford theatre productions including Twelfth Night at the Oxford Playhouse, The Recruiting Officer at New College Cloisters, and As You Like It at Lady Margaret Hall Gardens.

== Career ==
=== Theatre ===
Havill began his career with the Royal Shakespeare Company (RSC). In 1989, he portrayed Lysander at the Royal Shakespeare Theatre's production of A Midsummer Night's Dream and Reynaldo at the Barbican Theatre's production of Hamlet. He appeared in the Fortune Theatre's productions of The Woman in Black in 1989 and 1996.

Throughout the 1990s, Havill performed in a number of plays at London's West End and elsewhere. He portrayed several characters at the Barbican Theatre in an RSC production of A Clockwork Orange and at The Pit London in A Woman of No Importance. In conjunction with the RSC, Havill's focus was Shakespeare; in 1990, he portrayed George Seacoal in Much Ado About Nothing, Peter Arnold in Two Shakespearean Actors and The Merchant in The Comedy of Errors; from 1991 to 1992, he portrayed Sir William Bagot in an RSC production of Richard II at the Barbican Theatre in London.

In 2003, Havill played Group Captain Windbreak in Justin Butcher's production of The Madness of George Dubya at the Arts Theatre in London. Michael Billington wrote in The Guardian that "Butcher's production... has a surprising jauntiness; ... Andrew Havill as an ineffectual group captain... stand[s] out." The following year, Havill was cast as the Reverend James Morell in George Bernard Shaw's Candida, for which The Guardian's Lyn Gardner wrote "Much of the pleasure of Christopher Luscombe's well-observed period production is in watching Andrew Havill's interesting Morell move from confident self-belief to bewildered self-doubt as he starts to understand that even goodness is a form of selfishness." Havill's other stage roles of the 2000s include working with Alan Ayckbourn on his play Virtual Reality, a West End production of Jean Anouilh's Ring Around the Moon, and roles in director Chris Luscombe's productions of The Comedy of Errors and The Merry Wives of Windsor at Shakespeare's Globe. Of the latter, Gardner wrote "Havill's comic timing is a joy."

Havill also appeared as Frank Ford in The Merry Wives of Windsor US tour of 2010. Ben Brantley commented in The New York Times, "As Ford... the excellent Mr. Havill is exactly as serious as he needs to be, reminding us that one of comedy’s main functions is to defuse bombs that in real life often explode and destroy." In 2012 and 2013, he was part of the original cast of James Graham's play This House, at the National Theatre, directed by Jeremy Herrin. His work has included three roles at Hampstead Theatre in the plays Farewell to the Theatre, Drawing the Line, and Wonderland, and a portrayal of the English physician Sir Gilbert Wedgecroft in a National Theatre production of Waste, with Anne Cox writing "Havill offers excellent support... as always." In 2019, Havill portrayed Warren Lewis at the Chichester Festival Theatre's production of Shadowlands opposite actors Liz White and Hugh Bonneville, having appeared with Bonneville in the Downton Abbey film of the same year.

=== Television ===
Havill made his television debut in Lucy Gannon's Soldier Soldier in 1993, followed by a portrayal of English critic John Davenport in The House of Elliot Series 3 the following year. From 1997 to 1998, Havill worked with Lynda La Plante on her drama series Trial & Retribution, playing Clarence Oxley on Trial & Retribution I and Crispin Oxley on Trial & Retribution II. Havill starred in two 1999 television mini series: Aristocrats and Wives and Daughters as Charles Bunbury and Sir Charles Morton respectively.

In the 2000s, his television roles included portraying Manet on The Impressionists, Elizabeth David (in which he featured as the husband of cookery writer Elizabeth David in the docudrama after whom it was named), and Daphne. He played the Chief Steward in the Christmas Doctor Who episode "Voyage of the Damned" and was in the BBC drama Spooks Series 8.

In 2011, Havill portrayed the Reverend Conrad Walker on ITV's Midsomer Murders (in the episode The Night of the Stag). In 2012, he was cast as the Royal Equerry, Harry, in the episode A Scandal in Belgravia of the mystery crime drama Sherlock due to his reputation for playing "well-spoken upper-class types." His work of the 2010s includes playing Victor McKinley on the BBC's Father Brown, Edward Sidwell on The Coroner Series 1, episode 8 (Napoleon's Violin), and Gareth Anderson on Vera (in the episode Natural Selection) in 2017.

Havill played factory owner Douglas Broome in the 2021 series The Nevers, and Professor Lucius Stamfield in Endeavour of the same year. In the fifth and sixth seasons of The Crown, he portrayed Robert Fellowes, the Queen's private secretary and brother-in-law of Princess Diana. He and twelve other cast members were nominated for the Screen Actors Guild Award for Outstanding Performance by an Ensemble in a Drama Series for their roles in The Crown. In 2024, he portrayed the criminal defence lawyer Stuart Wentworth QC in the British television drama Mr Bates vs The Post Office.

=== Film ===
Havill made his film debut in 1995, portraying Galant on Michael Hoffman's Restoration. Following this, he played Algernon in Brian Gilbert's 1997 film Wilde and Piers in Clare Kilner's 1999 film Janice Beard.

In the 2000s, Havill's film work included roles in Thaddeus O'Sullivan's 2002 period drama The Heart of Me as Charles (the fiancé of Helena Bonham Carter's Dinah), Douglas McGrath's 2002 period comedy-drama Nicholas Nickleby, Christine Jeffs' 2003 biographical drama Sylvia, and Sean Ellis' 2008 horror film The Broken as Doctor Myers.

In 2010, Havill portrayed the royal sound engineer Robert Wood in The King's Speech. He played the cabinet secretary to Meryl Streep's Margaret Thatcher in The Iron Lady (2011), Cameron in Hyde Park on Hudson (2012), and Turing's professor in The Imitation Game (2014). In 2019, he portrayed the Archbishop of Canterbury in David Michôd's historical drama film The King and Henry Lascelles, 6th Earl of Harewood in the historical drama film Downton Abbey. In Star Wars: The Rise of Skywalker (2019), he played a First Order Officer with a small speaking role. His work of the 2010s includes roles in The Awakening as George Vandermeer, Cloud Atlas as Mr. Hotchkiss, Dad's Army as Captain Meeks, My Cousin Rachel as Parson Pascoe, Gold as Sir James Benson, and Lyrebird as Maarten Wooning.

Havill portrayed Sir Philip Hendy in Roger Michell's 2020 film The Duke, along with actors Jim Broadbent and Helen Mirren. In 2021, he played Enid Baines' father George in the psychological horror film Censor, delivering "sterling work" as a "button-down" parent, and General Reginald Dyer in the Bollywood biographical historical drama film Sardar Udham. In 2024, he portrayed Commander Oliver Locker-Lampson in the Netflix documentary drama Einstein and the Bomb with Aidan McArdle as Einstein.

=== Other work ===
In 2023, Havill provided the voice for Sylvestre Lesage in the action role-playing game Final Fantasy XVI.

== Filmography ==
=== Film ===
Year	Title	Role	Notes	Ref(s)
1995	Restoration	Galant	Film debut	
1997	Wilde	Algernon		
1998	Titanic Town	Officer		
1999	Janice Beard	Piers		
2002	The Heart of Me	Charles (Dinah's fiancé)		
2002	Nicholas Nickleby	Mr. Nickleby		
2003	Sylvia	David Wevill		
2004	The Rocket Post			
2008	The Broken	Dr. Myers		
2008	Dummy	Doctor		
2008	Pop Art	Mr. Milton	Short	
2010	Mr. Nice	Prosecution Barrister		
2010	The King's Speech	Robert Wood		
2010	London Boulevard	Unlikely Vagrant		
2011	The Merry Wives of Windsor	Master Ford		
2011	The Awakening	George Vandermeer		
2011	The Iron Lady	Cabinet Minister		
2012	Hyde Park on Hudson	Cameron		
2012	Cloud Atlas	Mr. Hotchkiss		
2012	Les Misérables	Cochepaille		
2013	Closed Circuit	News Reporter 1		
2013	The List	Vickery		
2014	The Imitation Game	Teacher		
2014	Remainder	Peter Younger		
2015	The Carer	Dr. Satterthwaite		
2015	The Danish Girl	Danish Embassy Official		
2015	Letters from Baghdad	Sir Percy Cox		
2016	Dad's Army	Captain Meeks		
2016	Hot Property	Alan Day		
2017	My Cousin Rachel	Parson Pascoe		
2017	The Children Act	George		
2018	Gold	Sir James Benson		
2019	The King	Archbishop of Canterbury		
2019	Downton Abbey	Henry Lascelles, 6th Earl of Harewood		
2019	Star Wars: The Rise of Skywalker	First Order Officer #7		
2019	The Last Vermeer	Maarten Wooning		
2020	The Duke	Sir Philip Hendy		
2021	Censor	George		
2021	Sardar Udham	General Reginald Dyer		
2023	Such A Lovely Day	John	Short	
2024	Einstein and the Bomb	Commander Oliver Locker-Lampson		

=== Television ===
Year	Title	Role	Notes	Ref(s)
1993	Soldier Soldier	Liaison Officer	Television debut	
1994	The House of Eliott	John Davenport		
1997	The Peter Principle	Craig Hunter	U.S. title: The Boss	
1997	Harry Enfield & Chums	Jeremy		
1997	A Dance to the Music of Time	Sunny Farebrother		
1998	Heat of the Sun	Reverend Peter Michaeljohn		
1998	Kavanagh QC	Nicholas Gee		
1998	Trial & Retribution	Crispin Oxley; Clarence Oxley		
1999	Aristocrats	Charles Bunbury		
1999	Wives and Daughters	Sir Charles Morton		
2000	The Ghost Hunter	Professor Darcy		
2001	Office Gossip	Lonely Heart		
2002	ER	Daniel Newman		
2002	Casualty	Maurice Goodwin		
2002–11	Doctors	Ian Rickman; John Wilton; Mr. Ballard		
2003	Judge John Deed	Alexander Petros QC		
2003	The Bill	Doctor Waring		
2004	D-Day 6.6.1944	Jake Masterman	Television film	
2004	Island at War	Oberleutnant Flach		
2004	The Inspector Lynley Mysteries	Inspector Ardery		
2005	Casanova	English Chancellor		
2005	Hustle	Dr. Mansfield		
2005	Waking the Dead	Noel Simmons		
2005	Broken News	Nicholas Michaelmass		
2005	The English Harem	Lawrence of Arabia	Television film	
2006	Surviving Disaster	Kenneth Rayment		
2006	Elizabeth David: A Life in Recipes	Tony David	Television film	
2006	Silent Witness	Alan Garnett		
2006	Ancient Rome: The Rise and Fall of an Empire	Bassianus		
2006–07	The Impressionists	Manet		
2007	Nuclear Secrets	Harry Shergold		
2007	The Brussels	Affluent Suit		
2007	Daphne	Tommy Browning	Television film	
2007	Doctor Who	Chief Steward	Episode: Voyage of the Damned	
2008	Holby City	Shaun Brennan		
2008	A Touch of Frost	Howard Gellman		
2008	The Shooting of Thomas Hurndall	Deputy Ambassador	Television film	
2009	Jonathan Creek	Narrator		
2009	Henry VIII: The Mind of a Tyrant	Chapuys		
2009	Into the Storm	King's Private Secretary	Television film	
2009	Small Island	Mr. Ryder		
2009	Criminal Justice	John Race		
2009	Agatha Christie's Poirot	Sven Hjerson		
2009	Spooks	Roger Maynard		
2010	Law & Order	Cathal Morris		
2011	Midsomer Murders	Rev Conrad Walker		
2011	The Increasingly Poor Decisions of Todd Margaret	Colin de Glanville QC		
2012	Sherlock	The Equerry	Episode: A Scandal in Belgravia	
2013	Lightfields	Doctor		
2014	Father Brown	Victor McKinley		
2014	Trying Again	Seb		
2014	Messiah at the Foundling Hospital	Charles Jennens		
2015	Spotless	Andrew St. John-Payne		
2015	Partners in Crime	James Peel KC		
2015	Life in Squares	Clive Bell		
2015	The Coroner	Edward Sidwell		
2015	Virtuoso	Baron Von Faust		
2016	Call the Midwife	Denis Dawley		
2016	Witness for the Prosecution	Clifford Starling		
2016	Taboo	Quaker		
2016–17	The Frankenstein Chronicles	Reverend Ambrose		
2017	1066: A Year to Conquer England	Archbishop Stigand		
2017	Vera	Gareth Anderson		
2017	Man in an Orange Shirt	Major Fanshawe		
2017	Victoria	Dr. Pritchard		
2017	The Last Post	Dr. Russell		
2018	Trust	Patrick de Laszlo		
2019	Dad's Army: The Lost Episodes	Brigadier		
2021	Endeavour	Professor Lucius Stamfield		
2021–23	The Nevers	Douglas Broome		
2022	U-Boat Wargamers	Gilbert Roberts	Episode: The Mastermind	
2022	The Walk-In	Mr. Atkinson		
2022–23	The Crown	Robert Fellowes	Season 5 and Season 6	
2024	Mr Bates vs The Post Office	Stuart Wentworth QC	Television mini series	
2024–26	Industry	Lord Alexander Norton	Series 3–4	
2026	Dirty Business	Richard Aylard	Mini-series; 3 episodes	

=== Theatre ===
Year	Title	Role	Venue	Ref(s)
1989	A Midsummer Night's Dream	Lysander	Royal Shakespeare Theatre	
1989	Cymbeline	Briton Captain 2 Courtier; Guest	Royal Shakespeare Theatre	
1989	The Woman in Black	The Actor	Fortune Theatre	
1989	Hamlet	Reynaldo	Barbican Theatre	
1990	A Clockwork Orange	Geoffrey; Policeman 3	Barbican Theatre	
1990	Much Ado About Nothing	George Seacoal	Royal Shakespeare Theatre	
1990	The Comedy of Errors	Merchant	Royal Shakespeare Theatre	
1990	Two Shakespearean Actors	Peter Arnold	Swan Theatre	
1991	A Woman of No Importance	Gerald Arbuthnot	The Pit London	
1991–92	Richard II	Sir William Bagot	Barbican Theatre	
1992	A Woman of No Importance	Gerald Arbuthnot	The Pit London	
1996	The Prince's Play	Lord Tourland	National Theatre	
2000	Virtual Reality	Alex Huby	Stephen Joseph Theatre	
2002	Time and Time Again	Professor Darcy	Salisbury Playhouse	
2003	The Importance of Being Earnest	Jack	Theatre Royal Bath	
2003	The Madness of George Dubya	Group Captain Windbreak	Arts Theatre	
2004	Candida	Rev. James Morell		
2005	Arsenic and Old Lace	Mortimer	Theatre Royal	
2006	The Comedy of Errors	Antipholus of Syracuse	Shakespeare's Globe	
2007	Belmont	Bassanio	Two Temple Place	
2008	The Merry Wives of Windsor	Frank Ford	Shakespeare's Globe	
2008	Ring Round the Moon	Patrice Bombelles	The Playhouse Theatre	
2010	Noises Off	Garry Lejeune	Birmingham Repertory Theatre	
2010	The Merry Wives of Windsor	Frank Ford	Shakespeare's Globe	
2012	Farewell to the Theatre	George	Hampstead Theatre	
2012–13	This House	Alan Clark MP	National Theatre	
2013	Drawing the Line	Lord Louis Mountbatten	Hampstead Theatre	
2014	Wonderland	Walker	Hampstead Theatre	
2015–16	Waste	Sir Gilbert Wedgecroft	National Theatre	
2019	Shadowlands	Warren Lewis	Chichester Festival Theatre	
2026	Springwood	King George VI	Hampstead Theatre	
