= Silvester baronets =

Extinct baronetcy in the Baronetage of the United Kingdom

The Silvester Baronetcy, of Yardley, was a title that was created twice in the Baronetage of the United Kingdom, both times for John Silvester, Recorder of the City of London. The first creation came on 20 May 1815, with normal remainder to the heirs male of his body. The second creation came on 30 March 1822, with remainder in default of male issue of his own to his nephew, Philip Carteret Silvester, son of Rear-Admiral Philip Carteret and Mary-Grace, only sister of Sir John Silvester. The 1815 creation became extinct on Silvester's death in 1822 while he was succeeded in the 1822 creation according to the special remainder by his nephew, the second Baronet. He had earlier the same year assumed by Royal licence the surname of Silvester. This creation became extinct on his death in 1828.

== Silvester baronets, of Yardley (1815; First creation) ==
Escutcheon of the Silvester baronets of Yardley

- Sir John Silvester, 1st Baronet (1745–1822)

== Silvester baronets, of Yardley (1822; Second creation) ==
Escutcheon of the Carteret-Silvester baronets

- Sir John Silvester, 1st Baronet (1745–1822)
- Sir Philip Carteret Silvester, 2nd Baronet (died 1828)

Baronetage of the United Kingdom
Preceded by Brooke baronets	Silvester baronets of Yardley (second creation); 30 March 1822	Succeeded by James baronets
