= London Monster =

Eighteenth-century criminal

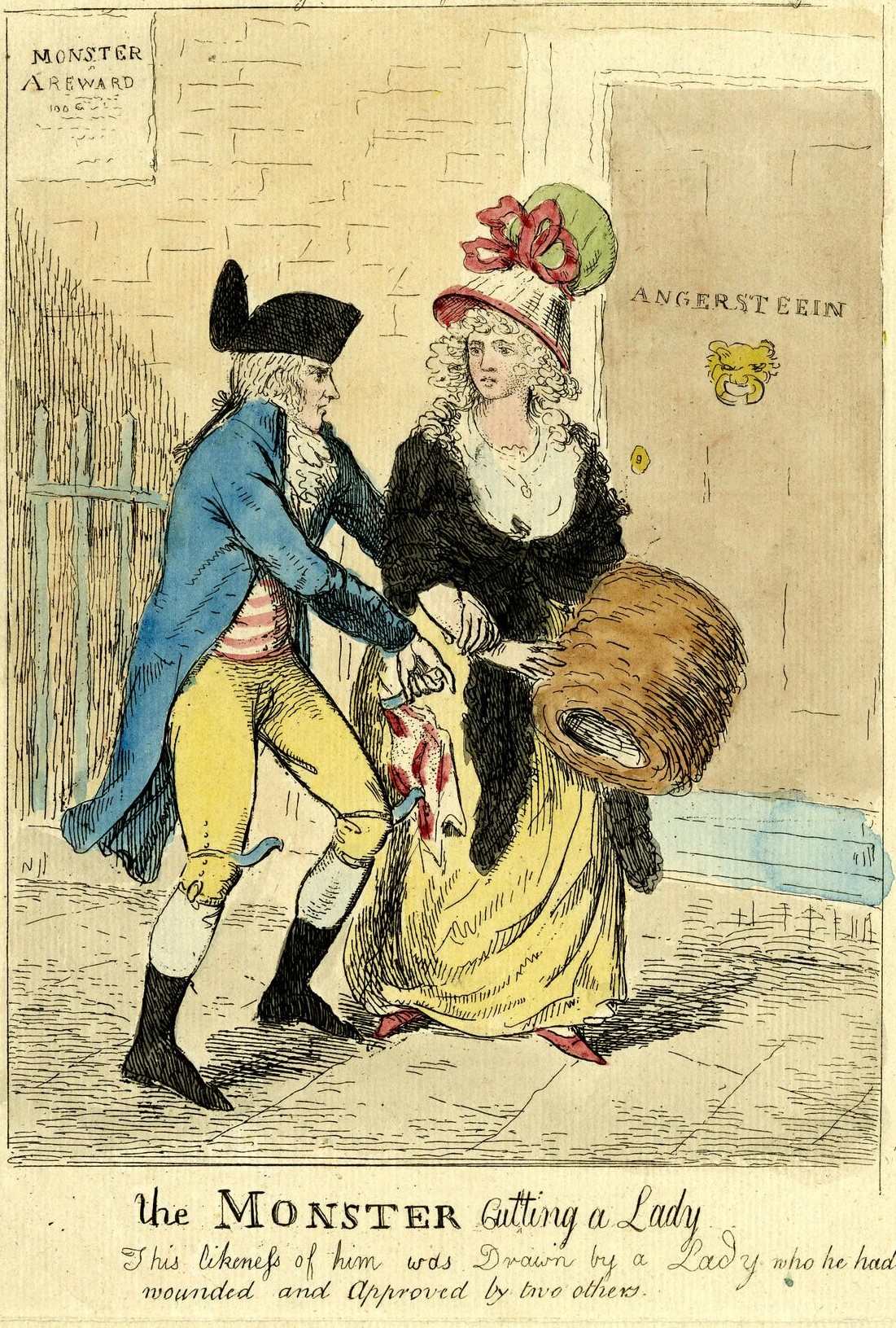
Cartoon by Isaac Cruikshank showing the London Monster cutting a woman with a knife; his knees also have knives attached

The London Monster was the name given to an attacker of women in London between 1788 and 1790. Renwick Williams, a Welsh maker of artificial flowers, was arrested for the attacks in June 1790, given two trials and sent to Newgate Prison for six years. The Monster's modus operandi was to verbally abuse women with lewd and suggestive comments and then attack them with a knife, cutting the clothing and slicing into buttocks, thighs or chest. Other forms of attack included having knives attached to his knees, possibly attached as a claw-like device to his hands or having a sharp implement hidden in a nosegay—a small flower bouquet. Over fifty women reported attacks, sometimes several on the same day, including up to six reported attacks in one night. Such was the number of attacks, variety of methods and discrepancies in the descriptions of the attackers, that historians are unsure if the Monster was one man or several.

There were five attacks in March and May 1788, eight attacks between May and December 1789 and forty-four between January and June 1790. Most of the women attacked in the first two years were described as being young, elegant and attractive, although this changed in 1790 to a wider range of victims. In April that year the philanthropist John Julius Angerstein met friends and like-minded people and arranged a reward of 100 guineas (equivalent to £13,000 in 2025) for the capture and conviction of the Monster. Increasing press interest and lurid reporting led to a moral panic in London. Over thirty innocent men were taken to Bow Street Magistrates' Court with their accusers hoping to claim the reward; all were released. Some women wore protection in the form of a copper petticoat for the wealthy, or a cork lining or porridge pot for the less well-off.

Williams was arrested when one of the attacked women claimed to recognise him as the attacker. In the magistrates' hearing several victims of the Monster said they did not recognise Williams as their attacker, although some did. At the Old Bailey trial he was found guilty but sentencing was deferred to the December Court of Sessions. Before that Williams was told he had been charged and tried under the wrong offence, so the Court of Sessions would be a retrial. He was again convicted, despite having an alibi for at least one of the attacks. There is doubt among some historians whether he was the attacker as no hard or forensic evidence was ever found. It is likely that copycat attacks took place, particularly as some of the assaults were recorded as being committed by a group of men.

== Attacks ==
=== 1788 ===
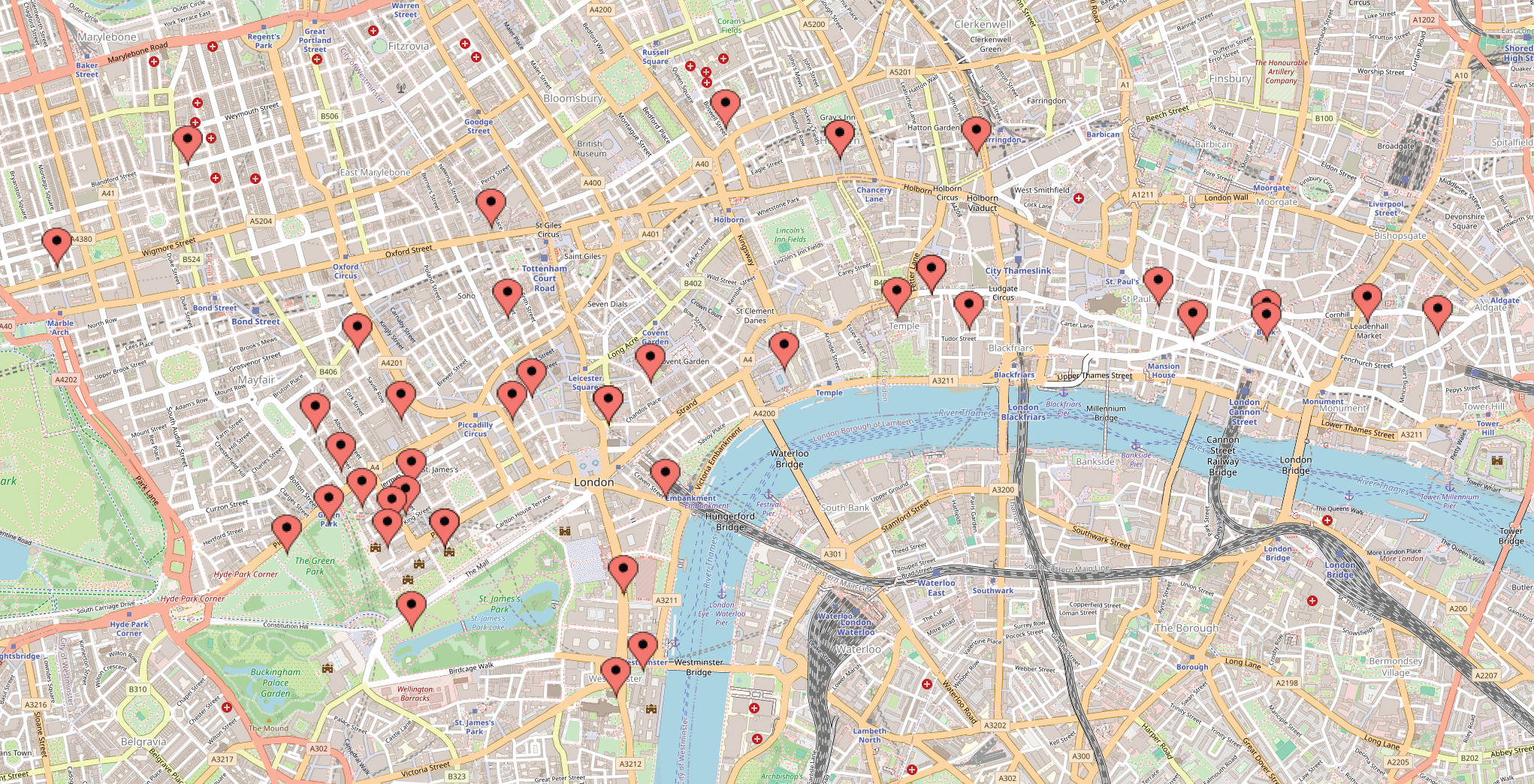
Approximate locations of the attacks by the London Monster. Some pins represent the general area of multiple attacks.

The first attacks by what came to be known as "the London Monster" were in March 1788 when a woman was attacked in Great Trinity Lane, off what is now Queen Victoria Street in central London. A man approached her and cut through her petticoats, wounding her in the process. The attack was reported in The Times, which gave the description of the perpetrator as "a young man ... dressed in a blue coat, worsted stockings, about the middle size, harsh featured, sallow complection, thin faced, with hair tied behind". It was followed by a similar attack the same month on a Mrs Wright in nearby Bow Lane; she described the man as "of a shabby appearance, much like a hair-dresser".

In May 1788 Maria Smyth, a doctor's wife, was approached by the Monster in Fleet Street. He started making obscene comments to her; she did not reply and walked away. He followed, continuing with the lewd commentary throughout her walk. As she knocked on the door of her destination, he stepped up beside her and stabbed towards her left breast and then her left thigh. Rather than escaping, he stood there until the door had closed after Mrs Smyth. She was found to have a cut on her leg and a slash on her chest, although this did not penetrate beneath the stays of her corset. Mrs Smyth was so affected by the attack that she fell ill and spent several months in bed. She described her attacker as:

... a thin man, rather below the middle size, pale, narrow face very remarkable, as well as his voice, in which there appeared to be a tremulous eagerness; a very ugly leg and foot, light dress, cocked hat flapped on one side and vulgar looking, without a stick, or any thing in his hands.

There were two more attacks that May. They included Mrs Chippingdale, a servant of Lord Malden, who was approached by a man who made obscene comments to her; when she knocked at a stranger's door—hoping the man would leave her—instead he stabbed her in the hip. He did not attempt to run away, but stood for a moment to watch her. Like Mrs Smyth, Mrs Chippingdale was ill for a while after the attack. There were no further reported attacks until the following May.

=== 1789 ===
In May 1789 Sarah Godfrey was followed from Bond Street to Piccadilly by a medium-sized man who looked to be about thirty. When she stepped into the doorway of a shop in Piccadilly, he stepped up beside her and made lewd propositions; she ignored him and went into the shop. On the way out he followed her back to her home in nearby Charlotte Street and stabbed her in the upper thigh as she was about to enter her house. There were seven more similar attacks on women in London in 1789, including five between September and December that the historian and criminologist Christopher Hamerton described as "serious unprovoked incidents of wounding". In all five the physical attacks—cuts to their bodies with a blade—were preceded by lewd suggestions in obscene language.

=== 1790 ===
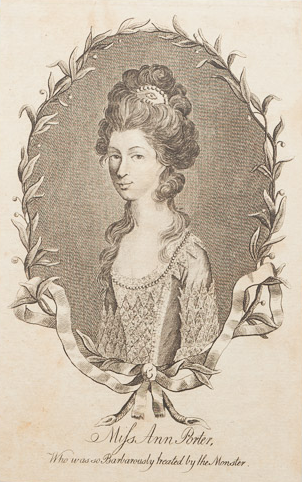
Anne Porter, 1790

The attacks of 1788 and 1789 had followed a pattern of a woman—often being described as being young and pretty—being approached and addressed with lewd or obscene language, then stabbed or sliced. This changed in 1790 with the Monster taking a different approach, using different weapons and an increasing frequency of attacks.

Six attacks took place on 18 January 1790, five in St James's Street and one in nearby Dover Street. The victims included two sisters, Anne and Sarah Porter, who were returning from Queen Charlotte's birthday ball in St James's Palace when they were attacked; Sarah was knocked on the head and Anne received a deep cut from a blade. On examination the cut was found to be six inches long and up to three inches deep in the middle; it ran up the back of her thigh and into her buttock. (Note: The other four women attacked that night all had their clothing cut, but were not physically harmed by the event.) The sisters described the attacker as "middle sized, rather slender and thin, a face sharp, thin and remarkable; pale countenance and with a tremulous agitated voice". According to Hamerton the attacks on the Porters marked "the turning point in public awareness and scrutiny" of the attacks. The Porters' father reported the crime to the magistrates at Bow Street Magistrates' Court a few days later; he was informed by Sir Sampson Wright, the Chief Metropolitan Stipendiary Magistrate, that there were four other attacks the same night and that there was a serial offender active. Reflecting on the evening the philanthropist John Julius Angerstein—who was interested in the events surrounding the Monster—wrote that given the number of:

different attacks on ... different parties of ladies, in as many different streets, at the same period of time, we may conclude, to a certainty of conviction, that there must be a gang, or, at all events, there must certainly be several of these horrid monsters ...

The attacks continued in January 1790, including on one Mrs Drummond, who returned home from the theatre to find that not only had her clothes been cut, so had her hair. An attack on a maidservant in late January consisted of a man grabbing her from behind and kneeing her buttocks while shouting abuse at her. She found afterwards that she was badly cut around the buttocks and thighs; Angerstein wrote the blades "must have been fastened to the man's knee". (Note: The theory is also repeated in several modern histories of the London Monster, including those by Hamerton, the writer Jan Bondeson, and the psychologist Robert Bartholomew and the philosopher Paul Weatherhead.) There was only one reported attack in February 1790; the victim's clothes were cut, but she was physically unharmed. In mid-March Mrs Charlotte Payne, the lady's maid to the Countess Howe, was also cut by being kneed by her assailant. He followed her along Bond Street and Grafton Street making lewd suggestions before assaulting her when she reached home. While assaulting her, the attacker verbally abused her, including saying "Damn you, you bitch, I would enjoy a particular pleasure in murdering you, or in seeing you murdered, and in shedding your blood".

In April 1790 the attacker used a different tactic when he assaulted a servant. She was approached in Holborn by a man carrying a nosegay—a small flower bouquet—who asked her to smell the flowers. When she did, she was stabbed in the nose by a sharp implement hidden within the blooms. This was followed by a different servant being approached by four men in the Strand and an offer made to smell their nosegay; she was stabbed just beneath the eye by a hidden blade. The men walked off laughing. The attacks were among the twelve that took place in April.

Letters in the London press bemoaned the lack of action by the Bow Street Runners, the law enforcement officers of the Bow Street Magistrates' Court. Some of the letters received accused the Runners of colluding with the attacker. William Smyth—the husband of Maria Smyth who had been attacked in May 1788—wrote to several of the victims and asked for a full description of the attackers. He came to the conclusion that they had been attacked by different people. Maria thought she saw her attacker on 14 April at a public auction; her husband followed the man to his home and established he was a man named William Tuffing. Tuffing was arrested and held for questioning while he pleaded his innocence. At a hearing on 19 April several of the victims were brought to him to identify him, but none identified him as their attacker. He was only freed after a Runner delivered news of another attack, which had taken place while the hearing was in progress.

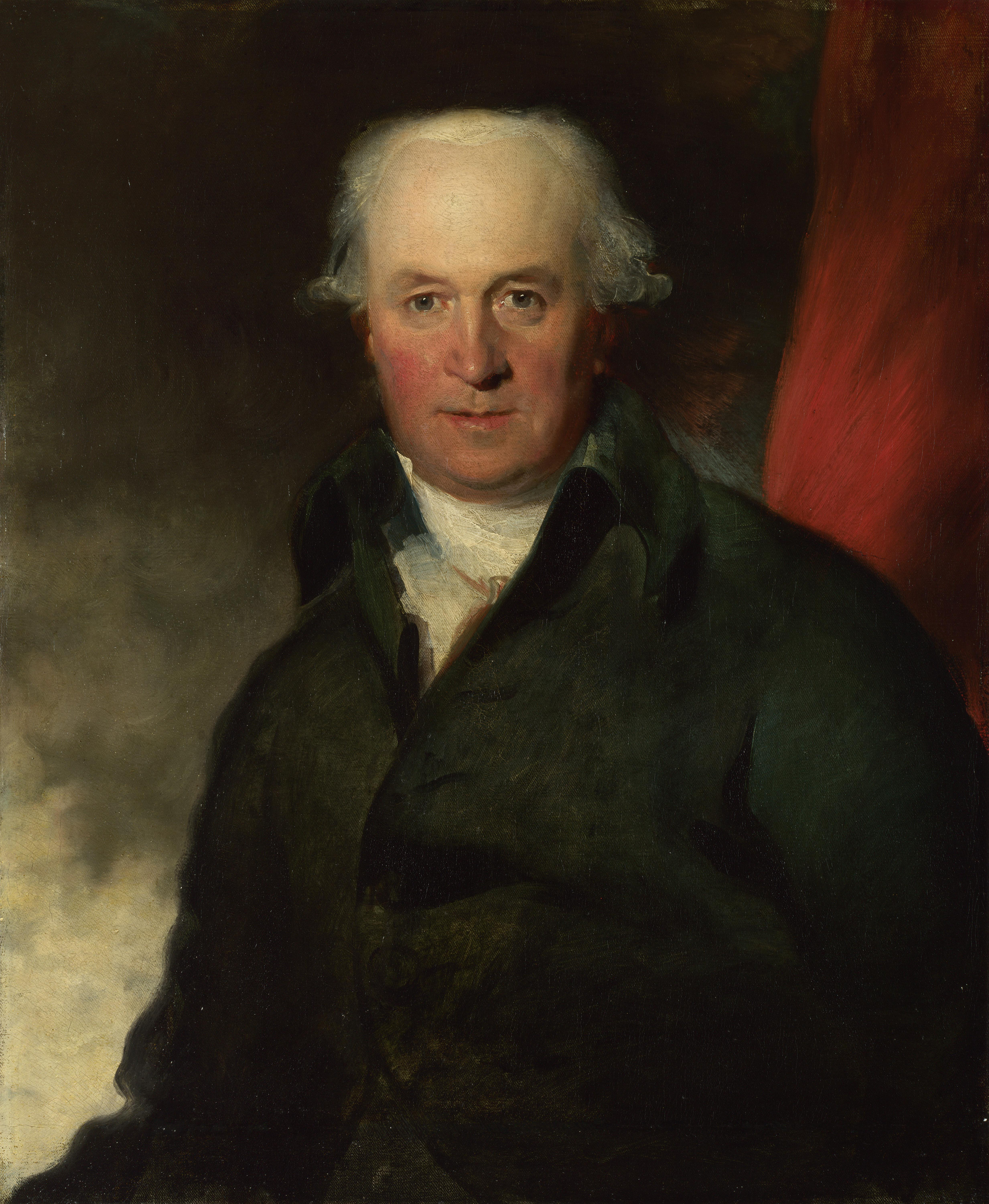
Angerstein in 1790, the year he offered a £100 reward for the Monster (Note: £100 in 1788 is approximately equivalent to £13,040 in 2025, according to calculations based on the Consumer Price Index measure of inflation.)

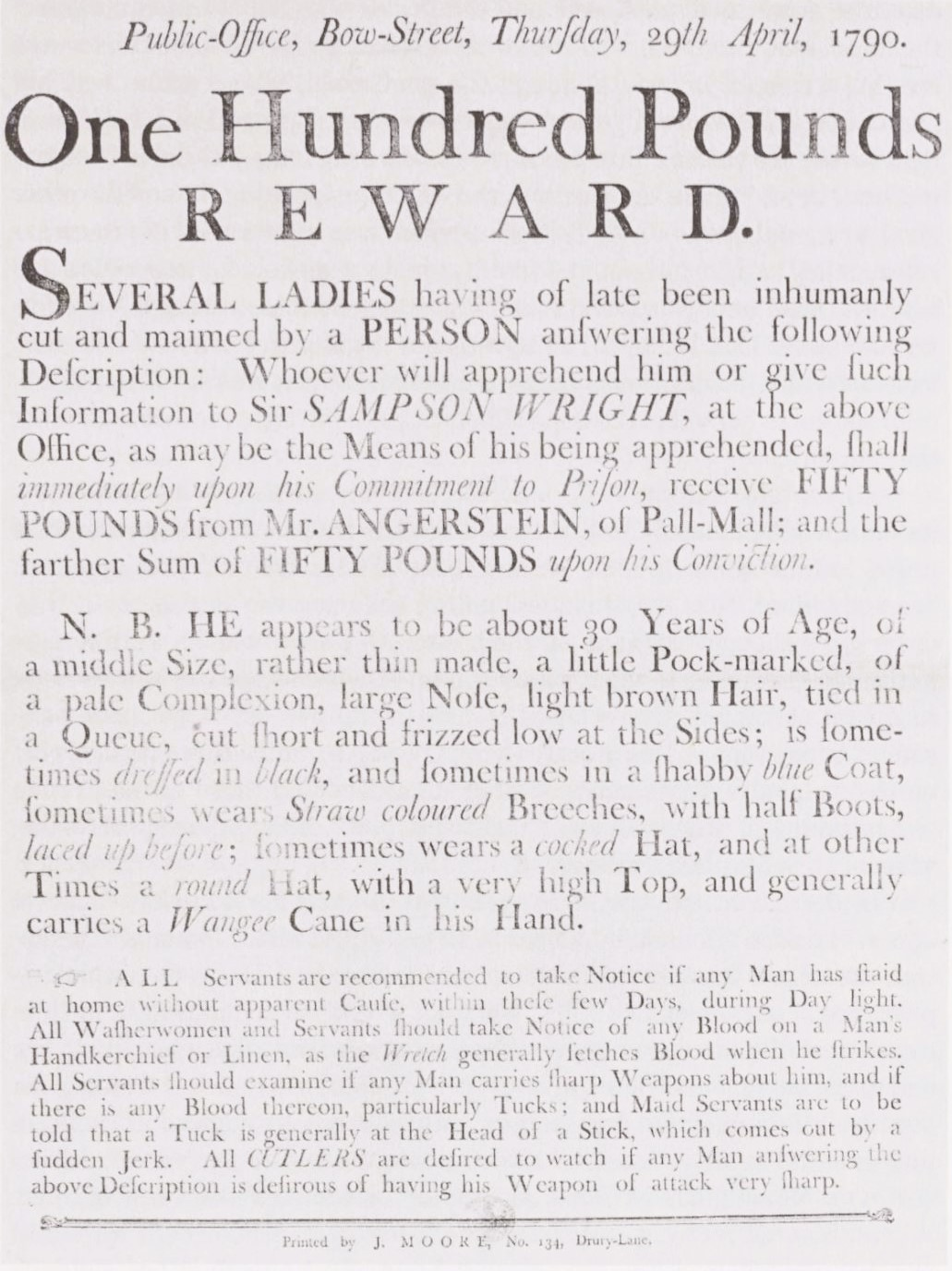
Reward poster circulated by Angerstein

On 15 April Angerstein met several friends and like-minded people at Lloyd's Coffee House in Lombard Street to discuss the problem of the London Monster. They agreed to offer a reward of £50 for anyone who apprehended the attacker or provided information for his arrest, with an additional £50 once the perpetrator had been convicted. (Note: £50 in 1788 is approximately equivalent to £6,520 in 2025, according to calculations based on the Consumer Price Index measure of inflation.) Angerstein had reward posters put up across London. The offer of a large sum of money when the average wage in the UK was 22 1/2 d a day led to an influx of information to the Bow Street Runners. (Note: 22 1/2 d equates to approximately £11.99 in 2025, according to calculations based on the Consumer Price Index measure of inflation.) Many citizens took matters into their own hands, arresting people without any evidence at all; these included someone who arrested their employer and another who arrested a relative. None of those brought into the court were identified by Porter or the other victims as being the attacker.

The attacks continued into May 1790, when there were seventeen that month. This may have been despite the increased publicity from the newspaper reports and the reward, although the historian Robert Shoemaker suggests "the extensive printed reports of the Monster appear to have stimulated some of the very attacks about which they complained". The attacks included one on a servant-girl, Mary Carter, who was accosted by a man on her way home. He swore at her and seized her arm, then struck her on the side; she was saved from injury by her whalebone corset. Two nights later she was attacked again by the same man. While holding one hand over her mouth, he clawed at her arms with an instrument attached to his other hand. When she reached home she found her arm had been cut thirty or forty times.

== Arrest and trials of Renwick Williams ==
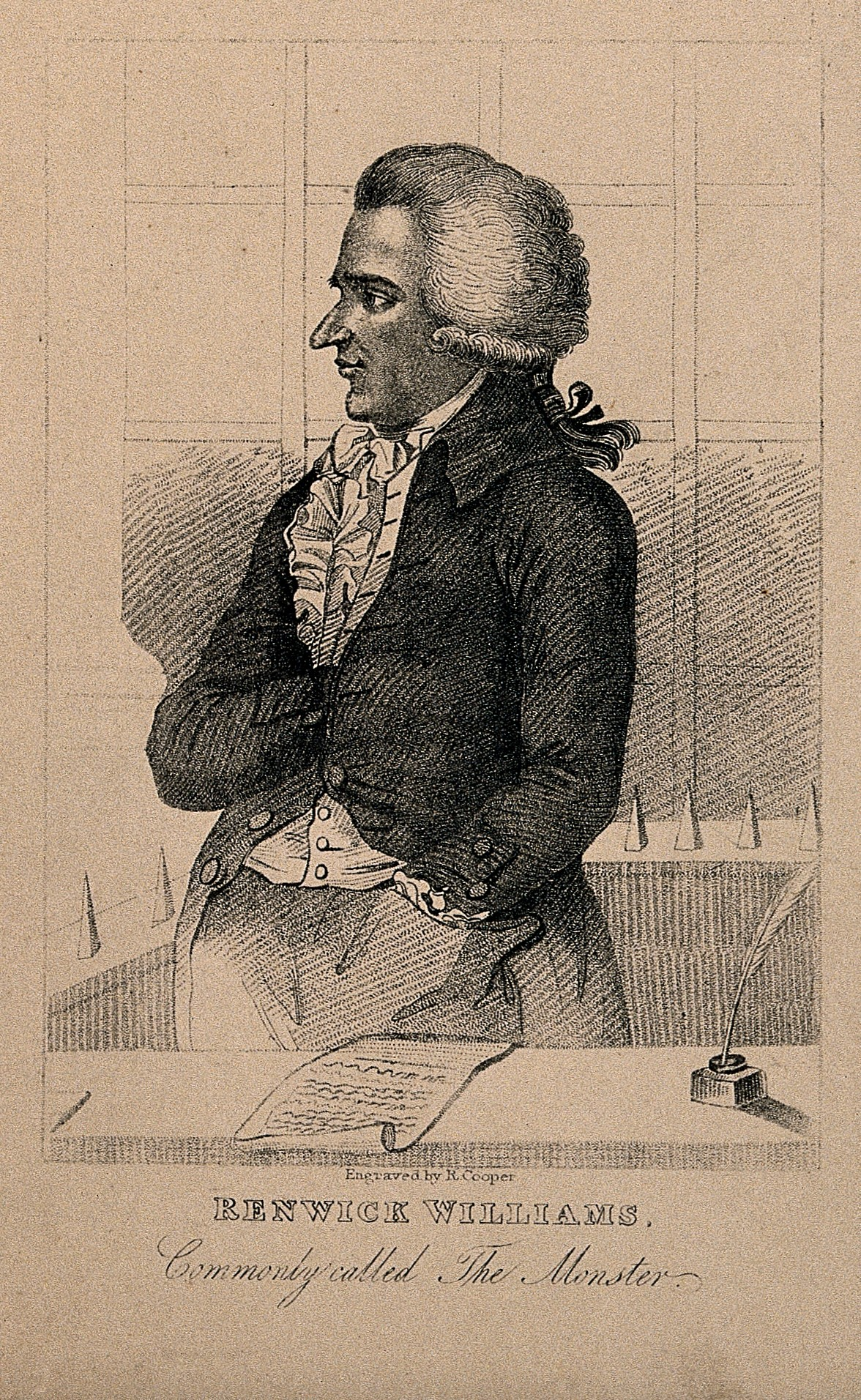
Renwick Williams in court

There was one attack in early June 1790, when a woman was threatened with a nosegay; this was the fifty-seventh attack reported. Three days later Anne Porter spotted the man who attacked her in St James's Park, where she was walking with her family and a suitor, John Coleman. She pointed him out to Coleman who followed him on an extended route around west London. The attacker realised he was being followed and, after a while, Coleman approached his quarry and persuaded him to accompany him to the Porters' house. Once there, Anne Porter identified him as the London Monster with the words "O my God, Coleman, that is the wretch, that is the wretch!"; she then fainted. A message was sent to the magistrates office in Bow Street and the man was arrested; he was transferred to Clerkenwell Prison to await trial. The attacker was identified as Renwick Williams, a twenty-three-year-old Welshman who made artificial flowers. (Note: William's forename is also given in some sources as Rhynwick.) Williams was living in shared accommodation at the George public house in Bury Street; his property was searched, but no knives or sharp implements were found. The following day when The Times reported his capture, they described him as:

a young man of genteel appearance, who unfortunately for his family has been in very dissipated habits of life, which have led him into expenses among women, and a line of conduct extremely injurious to his own character. The misfortune is the greater, as his friends are persons of character and reputation, who most severely feel for the excesses and wanton behaviour of this thoughtless young man, whose person is extremely well known about town.

On 14, 16 and 18 June, Williams was brought back to Bow Street Magistrates Court; on the first day a large crowd had gathered outside and the Bow Street Runners had to keep a path clear for him to reach the court safely and to leave at the end. Several of the Monster's victims were present at the hearing; their identifications ranged from the very certain to the unsure. Some of those who were certain that Williams was their attacker had given descriptions of very different looking individuals at the time, or had only seen him on a dark night several months previously. Williams had no legal representative and some of his comments did not help his cause: he stated at one point that he "did not deny being in the place mentioned, and said the accident might have happened from something in his pocket." After Anne Porter and her sister gave their evidence, Williams stated that he had been working at an artificial flower factory in Dover Street until 1:00 am that day, so could not have attacked them. By the end of the hearings, seven women had been bound over to appear against him in court.

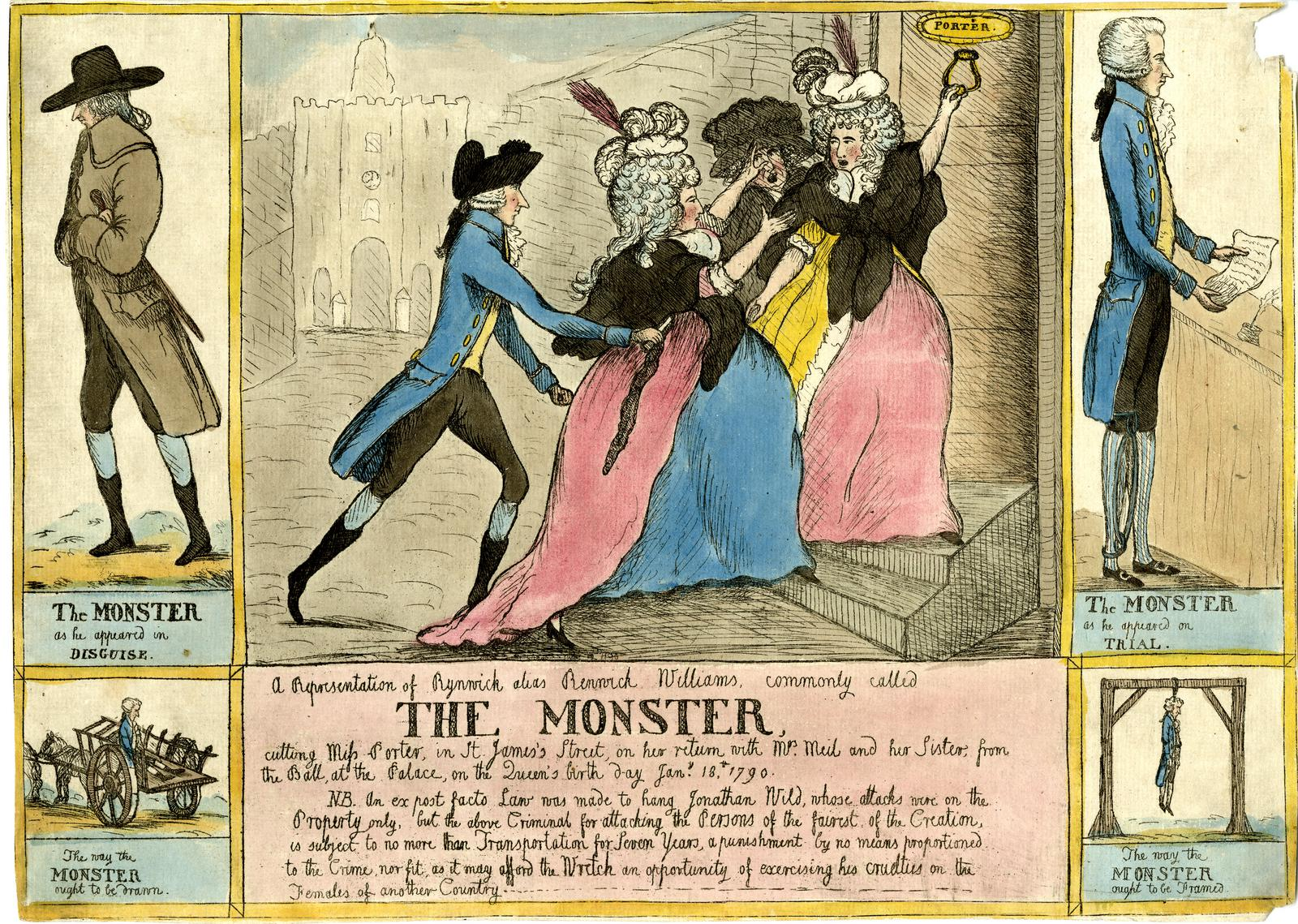
Satirical cartoon showing Williams as the London Monster attacking the Porter sisters. It suggests that Williams should be hanged, not transported.

At the time Britain's legal system was based on the Bloody Code series of laws which classed crimes as felonies—for more serious offences and punishable by death or transportation—or misdemeanours—for lesser offences, with punishments including prison, the stocks or flogging. Magistrates wanted to avoid charging Williams with a misdemeanour as it was thought this could be followed by public unrest, but many of the statutes were inappropriate for guaranteeing a conviction. This included the Black Act 1723, which forbade people to be armed while wearing a disguise, and the Coventry Act (1671), which involved lying in wait to commit malicious mutilation, neither of which were entirely pertinent: the attacker did not wear a disguise nor did he lie in wait for anyone. Eventually magistrates decided on a law from the 1720s that was introduced to stop weavers from damaging clothing. Thus when Williams faced trial at the Old Bailey on 8 July 1790, he was charged that he did:

unlawfully, wilfully, maliciously and feloniously, did make an assault on Anne Porter, spinster, with an intent to tear, spoil, cut and deface her garments and clothes; and on the same day, with force and arms, in the same public street, wilfully, maliciously and feloniously, did tear, spoil, cut and deface her garments

Williams entered a not guilty plea. He was represented by the barrister Newman Knowlys, although such was the disdain in which Williams was held, he and his brother—Thomas Williams, a well-known London apothecary—had struggled to find anyone willing to represent him. The judge was Sir Francis Buller. The court was full and the crowd contained nobles, journalists, workers and people of all social classes. Williams's main defence was that he was at work when Anne Porter was attacked. His employer at the artificial flower factory, a Frenchman named Aimable Michelle was cross-examined through an interpreter. He reported that Williams had worked until midnight, after which the two men had supper with Michelle's sister, Reine Michelle, before Williams left at 12:30 am. The sister was next to give her testimony and she was followed by two other workers from the factory who confirmed Williams's alibi. There were then seventeen character witnesses to speak in his favour. Many of these were jeered and mocked by the crowds in the court, according to the historian Cindy McCreery, possibly because they were French. Buller summed up and, after some deliberation, the jury returned a verdict of guilty. Sentencing was deferred until the December sessions and Williams spent the intervening time in Newgate Prison.

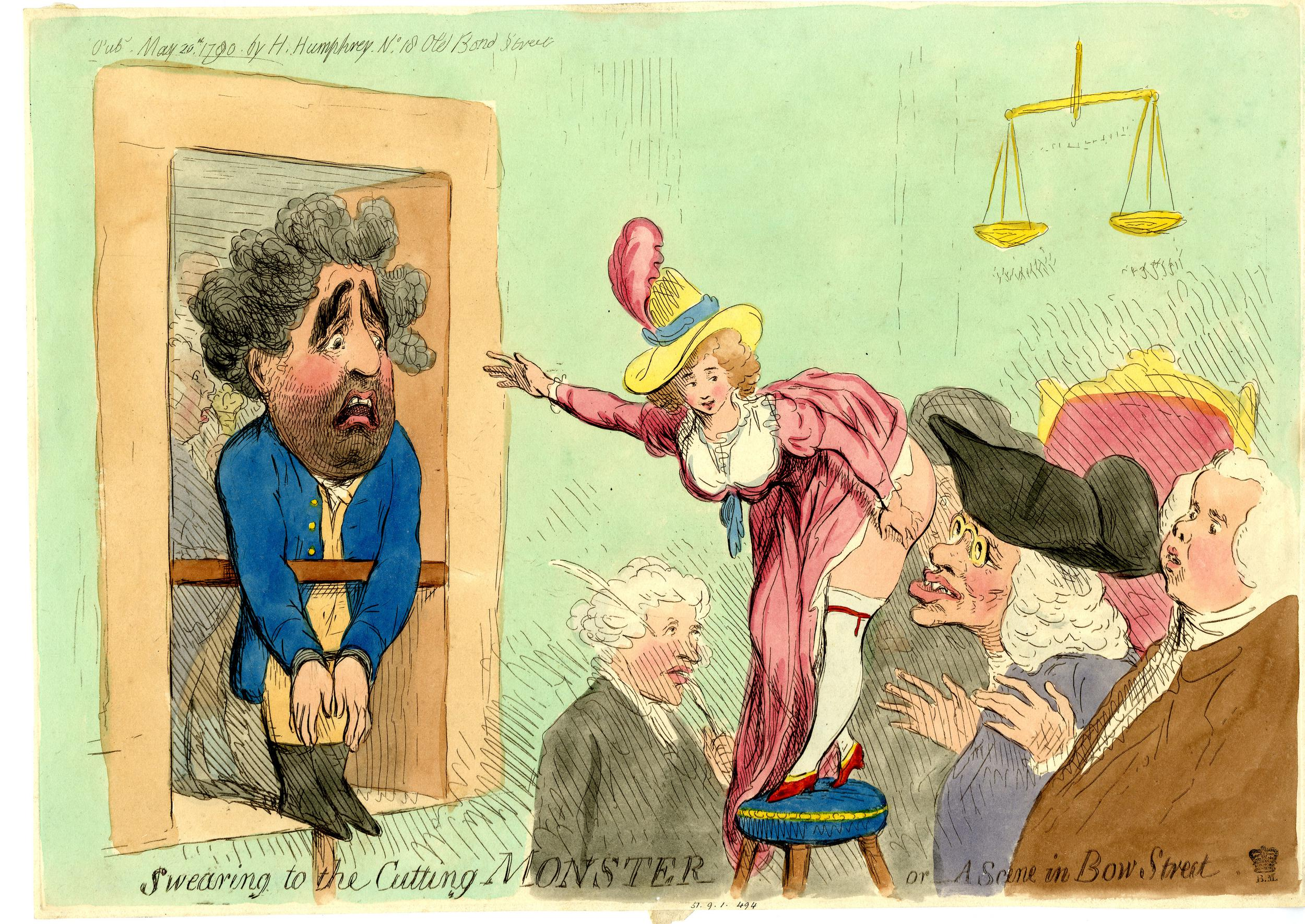
Satirical cartoon by James Gillray showing the scene in Bow Street Magistrates Court (Note: Bondeson observes that the figure in the dock, rather than looking like Williams, is similar to the politician Charles James Fox.)

There were sceptics of Williams's conviction who were concerned about the discrepancies in the various descriptions of the attacker and several newspapers began questioning the verdict; among these were Angerstein. Shortly after the trial ended, the Irish poet Theophilus Swift published a pamphlet The Monster at Large: Or, the Innocence of Rhynwick Williams Vindicated in which he queried some of the evidence given by the Porter sisters; he also asked why one of the attacked women had not been asked to give evidence when she had stated Williams was not the culprit. He wrote that Porter's description of her assailant at the time was of a thirty-year-old thin man with light-brown hair and a large nose; Swift went on to point out that Williams was twenty-two, stout with black hair and what he described as a "Grecian nose". According to Bartholomew and Weatherhead, "Amid the scurrilous gossip and veiled and not-so-veiled jibes at the Porter sisters and John Coleman, Swift makes some pertinent observations and valid arguments in the defence of Williams". On 10 November 1790 the senior English judges met to discuss Williams's case. It was agreed that his offence did not fall within the statute for which he had been tried and that he would have to face a retrial, but for a misdemeanour, rather than a felony. On 8 December Williams was taken to the Old Bailey where he was officially discharged of the felony, but charged with a misdemeanour offence.

Williams was taken to the Hicks Hall on Clerkenwell Green on 13 December for the sessions trial; he replaced his barrister with Swift. (Note: Swift studied law at the Middle Temple. He was called to the bar in 1774 and practised law until he moved back to Ireland in 1783.) The misdemeanour charge was that Williams did:

make an assault on Ann Porter, spinster, and did then and there with force and arms, maliciously beat, wound, and ill-treat her, with wicked intention, feloniously, wilfully, and of his malice aforethought, to kill and murder her; and that he did then and there, with a certain knife, maliciously cut, strike, and wound her.

The same witnesses were called as in the first trial. Swift's cross-examination was aggressive, and he made Ann Porter faint twice while she was in the witness box; smelling salts were applied. Swift remained unmoved and called out that "A certain kind of lady can faint at any time, as easily as a crocodile sheds tears!" Swift raised a possible reason why Ann Porter may have accused Williams: they were known to one another and he had previously insulted her. Porter had once had an affair with a criminal called "Captain Crowder" and absconded from home with him; her father had returned her two weeks later, although it is likely she visited Crowder in Newgate Prison while he was awaiting transportation. When Williams's amorous advances had been spurned by Porter, he said to her "Madam, I do not see that my person is not as good as the Captain's". This insult led to acrimony between the two and insults each time they saw each other in the streets. He called Coleman "Porter's puppy", a coward and a "dastardly fishmonger turned catamite". The following day the jury withdrew for fifteen minutes and returned with a decision of guilty of the three attacks on Porter, Elizabeth Davis and Elizabeth Baughan. Williams was sentenced to two years' imprisonment for each attack and then bound over to keep the peace for seven years, pay bail of £200 for good behaviour and sureties of a further £200. (Note: £200 in 1797 equates to approximately £22,000 in 2025, according to calculations based on the Consumer Price Index measure of inflation.)

In July 1792 Williams published the pamphlet An Appeal to the Public, by Rhynwick Williams. He berated Anne Porter and Coleman, calling the latter a "cowardly impotently creature", and repeated his innocence and bemoaned his situation. He was released from prison on 16 December 1796. He married one Elizabeth Robins in February the following year. The couple had already had a child which was conceived while Williams was still in Newgate; George Renwick Williams was christened on 31 May 1795 at St Sepulchre's church, London. No more is known about Williams after his wedding.

== Media coverage and Monster mania ==
Satirical cartoons by James Gillray

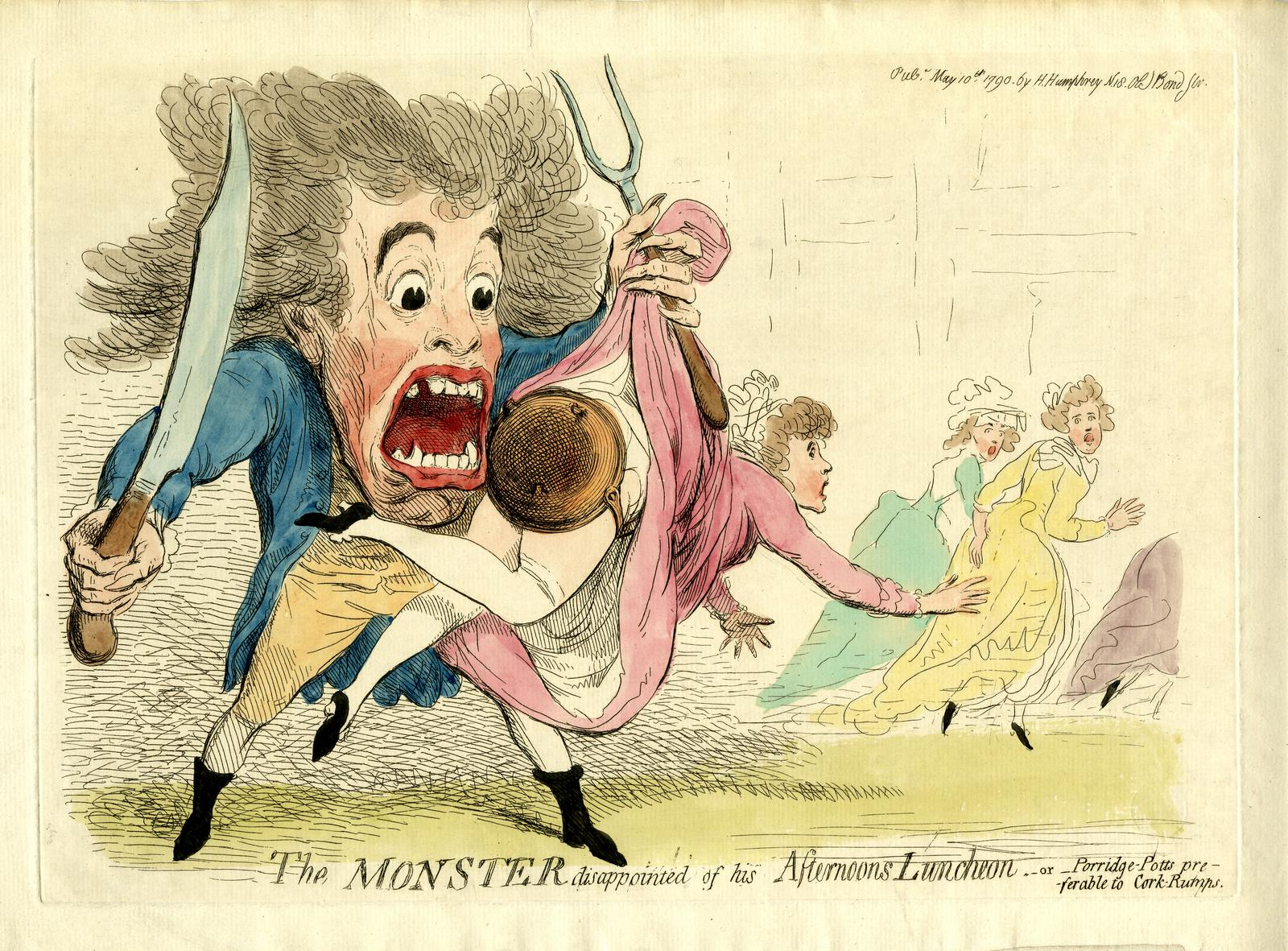
"The monster disappointed of his afternoons luncheon-or porridge-potts preferable to cork-rumps"

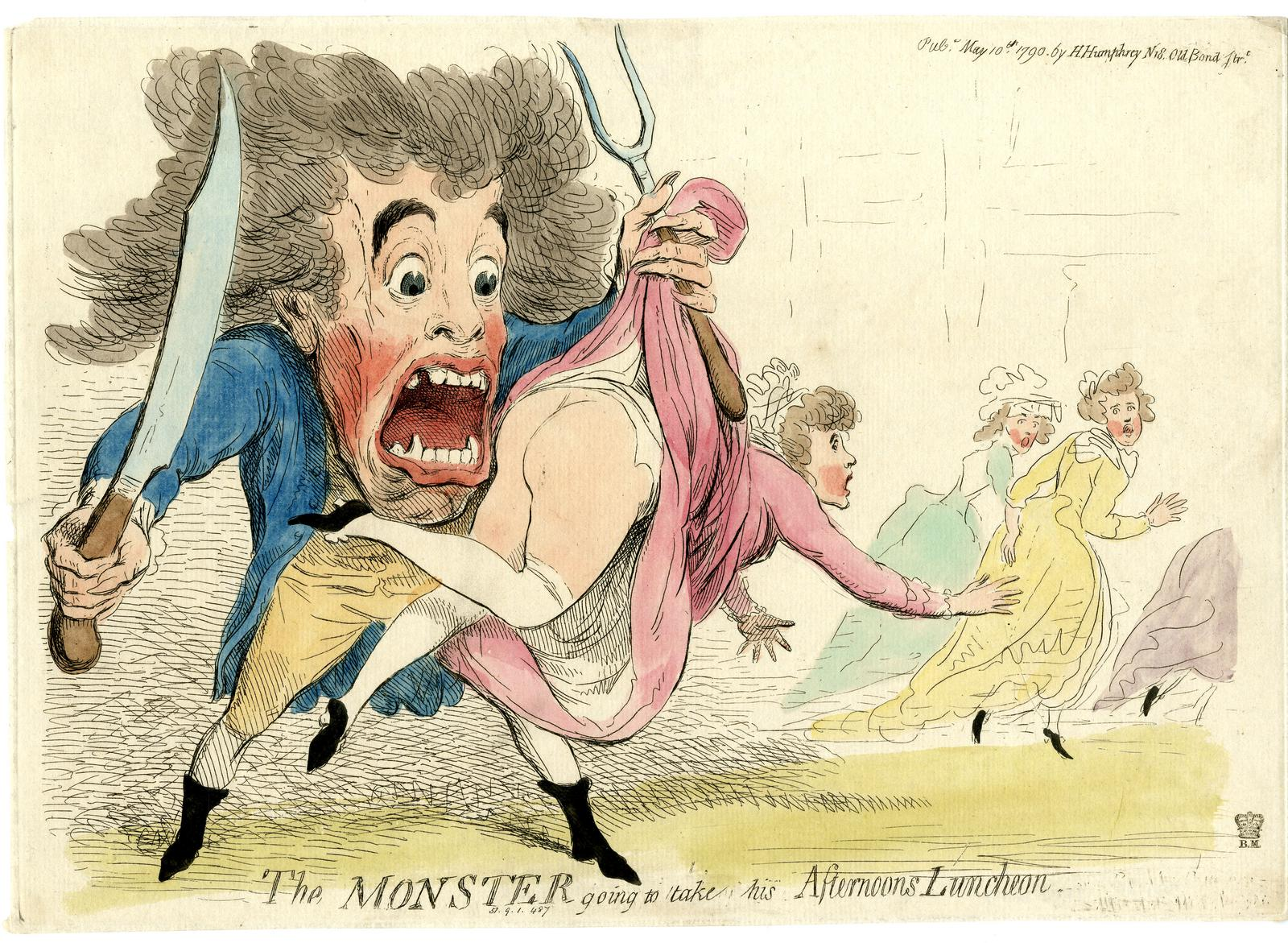
"The monster going to take his afternoons luncheon"

Although early coverage was limited, newspaper reports brought the matter to the attention of Angerstein. Through him, the Bow Street court and the press, the attacks became widely known in London. It was the press that labelled the attacker a "Monster" which, in McCreery's opinion, "emphasised ... [his] inhumanity". The press campaigned for the Monster's capture and fostered the idea that their publicity was the best way to ensure capture and conviction. McCreery considers that with the press pushing the agenda, the magistrates and Bow Street Runners were left behind. In doing so, the press would have profited from the increased sales generated.

The fear caused by the attacks was exacerbated by Angerstein's reward poster and newspaper reports to bring about panic and a "Monster mania", or what the historian Peter King called "an extended moral panic". Two vigilante groups—one in Westminster and one in St Pancras—were formed to find the culprit, and detained several people, although all were innocent. By 17 May over thirty men had been turned over to Bow Street Magistrates Court accused of being the Monster; all were innocent and released. Other men formed a "No Monster Club" of those above suspicion and wore badges declaring their status. Angerstein described the feeling in London in 1790:

It became dangerous for a man even to walk along the streets alone, as merely calling or pointing out some person as the Monster, to the people passing, was sufficient to endanger his life; and many were robbed, and extremely abused, by this means.

No man of gallantry dared to approach a lady in the streets after dark, for fear of alarming her susceptible nature.

There was a total suspension of all street amours. ...

The whole order of things was changed. It was not safe for a gentleman to walk the streets unless under the protection of a lady.

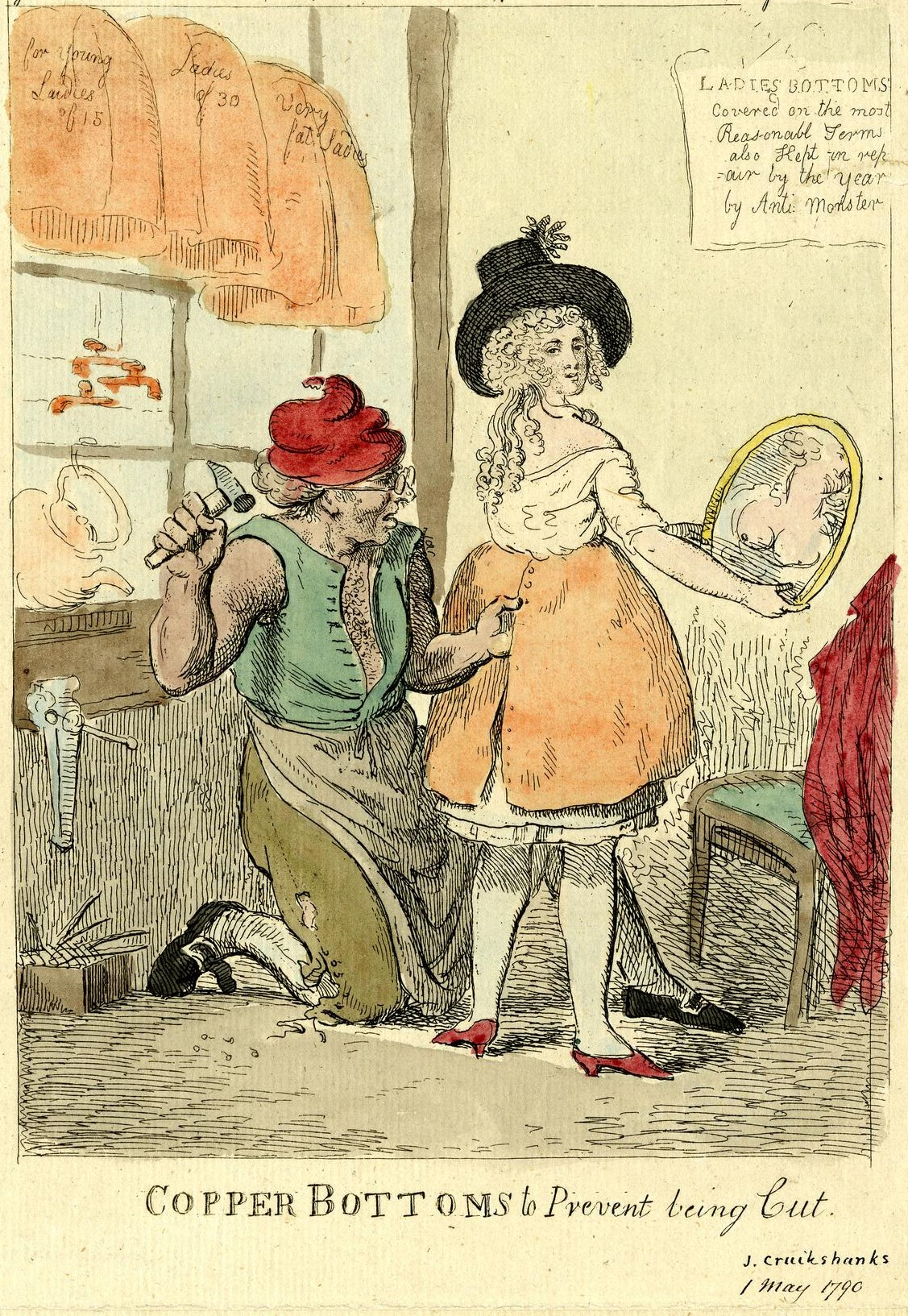
Cartoon by Isaac Cruikshank showing a woman being fitted with a copper petticoat to protect herself from attacks

Women began to wear protection under their skirts: the well-off wore copper linings in their petticoats; the less well-off would use a cork lining or, according to the writer Jan Bondeson, a large porridge pot. Some pickpockets took advantage of the growing hysteria around the attacks; when one group had been seen by their victim picking his pockets, they pointed at him and shouted that he was the Monster and had just cut a woman; they escaped in the subsequent confusion. The World newspaper reported that:

A vast number of people immediately pursued the gentleman, some calling out "The Monster", others "Stop Thief!", till at length he was knocked down and surrounded by near a thousand people, by whom he was very ill treated and probably would not have escaped with his life, had he not been, by some gentlemen, taken into the Gray's Inn Coffee House.

The mob subsequently tried to charge into the coffee house, but the man escaped into the nearby Brown Bear public house; the mob attacked the pub, smashing windows and laying siege to the building for several hours. The man was extracted in disguise and taken to Bow Street court for his own protection. The incident was only one of several when false claims of someone being the Monster led to their beatings. Other criminals took advantage of the situation too: one man—a Mr Heather—was at Tower Hill one evening when he saw a woman lying on the ground with blood on her clothing. He called up a cab to take her home; once the cab had gone, he found he had been pickpocketed of his watch and three guineas. (Note: According to calculations based on the Consumer Price Index measure of inflation, three guineas in 1790 is approximately £410 in 2025.)

When news of Williams's living arrangements was released—that he was a maker of artificial flowers who rented a shared space of three beds with five other men—the press began to publish innuendos that the Monster was a man in an effeminate job who shared his bed with several other men. Hamerton observes that shared accommodation was common at the time and "Williams's domestic arrangements were almost certainly related to poverty and necessity rather than sexuality or choice". Many papers portrayed Williams as a sodomite at a time when homosexual acts between men were illegal and Britain still had the death penalty for sodomy. (Note: The death penalty for sodomy was removed in Britain in 1861.) The Times portrayed Williams as being a womanising rake who had a good upbringing but had turned bad. The two descriptions of Williams ran in the press over the next few weeks.

McCreery observes the caricaturists were active in depicting the Monster and their works reflect the tastes of the time with much bawdy humour, dealing with the subject in a light-hearted manner. The women in particular were often portrayed in the cartoons as "sexual curiosities" being leered over either by the Monster or the crowds in the court room, according to the historian Barbara M. Benedict. Isaac Cruikshank's double print "The Monster Cutting a Lady" and "Copper Bottoms to Prevent Being Cut" show the same woman being attacked and then having a copper petticoat fitted. In the second image she is half dressed, her breasts showing in a mirror; the image thus shows "news, horror and eroticism in equal measure", according to Hamerton. There were exceptions to the light-hearted approach and the cartoon by William Dent "A Representation of Rynwick Alias Renwick Williams, commonly called The Monster" puts forward the position that transportation was too lax a penalty for Williams, who Dent thinks should be hanged.

London theatres began putting on plays about the Monster, with The Monster being performed at Astley's and The Monster Discovered at the Drury Lane theatre. Once it was realised that the victims of the attacks were generally attractive and financially well-off women, there was prestige in being one of his victims. Some women began to fabricate stories of being attacked and some even injured themselves to be thought of as one of his targets.

== Modern analysis ==
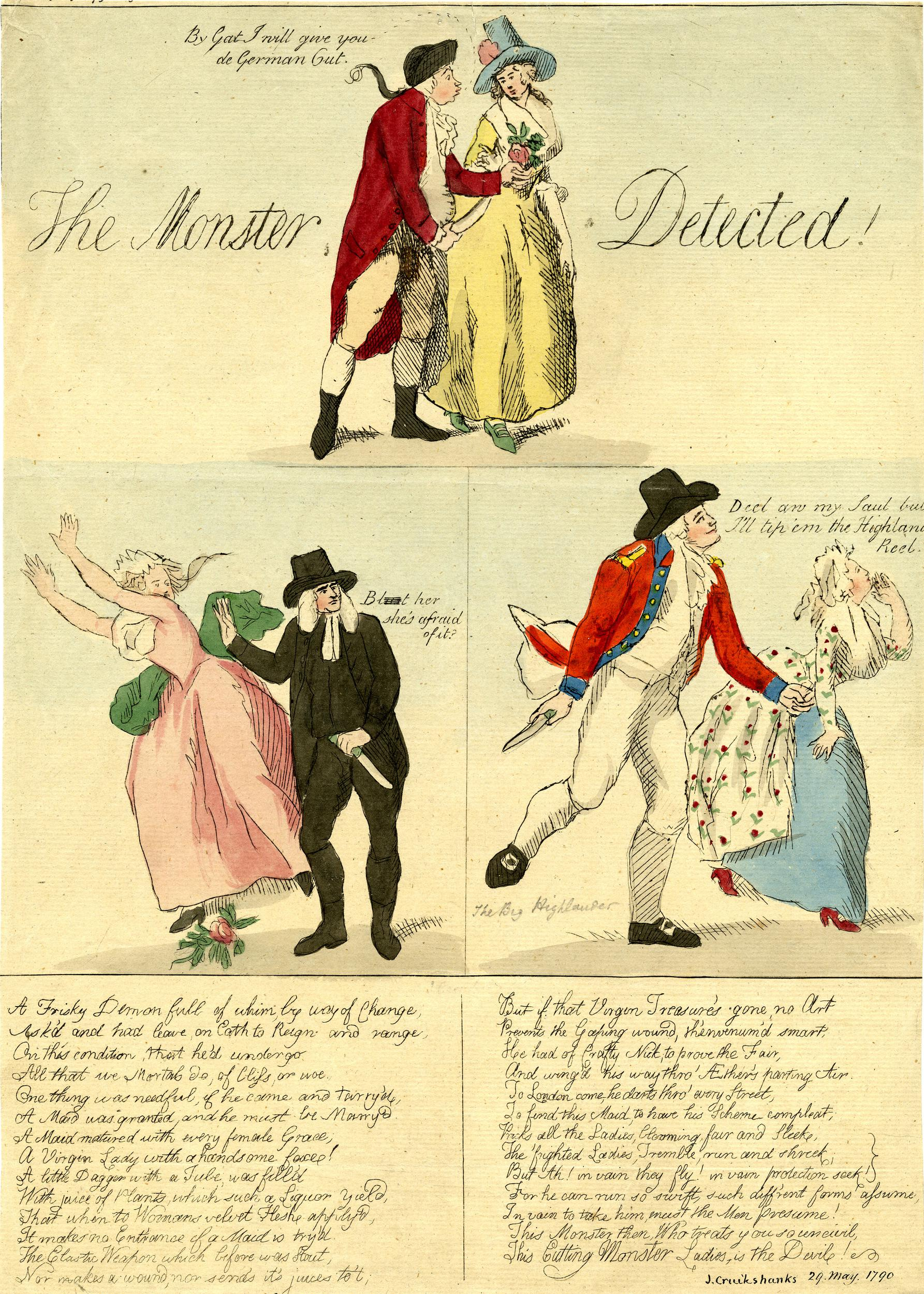
A satirical print imagining the Monster as the devil (Note: The verse tells the story that a devil could visit earth as long as he married an attractive virgin; to ensure they were virgo intacta he tested them: A little Dagger with a Tube, was fill'd With Juice of Plants, which such a Liquor yield That when to Womans velvet flesh apply'd It makes no Entrance if a Maid is try'd. The poem says that as virgins were scarce in London, he had to stab a multitude of women, which is what led to the Monster mania.)

Several historians—like some at the time, Angerstein included—consider the attacks to have been undertaken by more than just Williams. Shoemaker states that the publicity from Angerstein and the press probably meant copycat attacks took place, and this seems to be supported by the increased frequency of the attacks and the difference in methods employed. Angerstein was unhappy about the different descriptions of the attacker, and his pamphlet referred to either a gang or several different Monsters; it also contained details of several assaults by groups of men who walk away laughing after their assaults.

Bartholomew and Weatherhead do not think it likely that Williams was the Monster. He had a good alibi for the attack on Ann Porter, and the Porters and Coleman could have been seeking revenge for his previously insulting behaviour; they also received the 100 guinea reward. Several of the attacked women who saw Williams in the Bow Street court stated that Williams was not their attacker. As there were some attacks after Williams's arrest, Bartholomew and Weatherhead consider him to be "an unfortunate scapegoat".

The cultural historian Julie Peakman observes that piquerism—the sexually sadistic act of cutting or stabbing another person with sharp objects—was historically a relatively common crime and she views the London Monster as an example of the disorder. Peakman draws parallels with the piqueurs of Paris in 1820; the "Hip Stabber" in Metz, France, who stabbed twenty-three women; a case in Trier, Germany, where a man stabbed the genitals with a needle and Ivan Kaprovitch in Kiev, Ukraine, in 1901 who stabbed several young girls in the throat and abdomen with a penknife. The criminal historian Drew Gray thinks it likely that Williams was "unable to achieve sexual satisfaction in any other way", and as such he shares a similar psychological profile to Jack the Ripper.

To his contemporaries, the Monster's motives were deviant and incomprehensible. The absence of rape or sexual assault would have been seen as "feral animalistic deviance", according to Hamerton. The effect would have been the weakening of the social statuses of both men and women and led to thoughts in some of "ethereal folk devils". McCreery sees the attacks as corrupting the innocence of the Monster's victims, lessening their appeal to suitors and devaluing them in society.

== See also ==
- Halifax Slasher, a similar incident in 1938 in Halifax, West Yorkshire
- Mad Gasser of Mattoon
- Spring-heeled Jack
- Whipping Tom

== Notes and references ==
=== Sources ===
==== Books ====
- Angerstein, John Julius (1790). A Circumstantial Account of all the Barbarities Practised by the Monsters! (3rd ed.). London: S. Bladon. OCLC 510682081.
- Bartholomew, Robert E.; Weatherhead, Paul (2024). Social Panics & Phantom Attackers. Singapore: Palgrave Macmillan. doi:10.1007/978-981-97-4272-1. ISBN 978-9-8197-4271-4.
- Benedict, Barbara M. (2001). Curiosity: A Cultural History of Early Modern Inquiry. London: University of Chicago Press. ISBN 978-0-226-04264-0.
- Boe, Ana de Freitas; Coykendall, Abby (2014). Heteronormativity in Eighteenth-Century Literature and Culture. Farnham, Surrey: Ashgate. ISBN 978-1-4724-3017-5.
- Bondeson, Jan (2005). The London Monster: Terror on the Streets in 1790. Stroud, Gloucestershire: Tempus. ISBN 978-0-7524-2583-2.
- Gray, Drew D. (2013). London's Shadows: The Dark Side of the Victorian City. London: Bloomsbury. ISBN 978-1-4411-4720-2.
- Hamerton, Christopher (2023). Devilry, Deviance and Public Sphere: The Social Discovery of Moral Panic in Eighteenth Century London. Cham: Palgrave Macmillan. doi:10.1007/978-3-031-14883-5. ISBN 978-3-0311-4882-8.
- McCreery, Cindy (2009). "A Moral Panic in Eighteenth-Century London? The 'Monster' and the Press". In Lemmings, David; Walker, Claire (eds.). Moral Panics, the Media and the Law in Early Modern England. Basingstoke, Hampshire: Palgrave Macmillan. pp. 195–220. ISBN 978-1-3493-5806-9.
- Moore, Lucy (2001). Con Men and Cutpurses: Scenes from the Hogarthian Underworld. London: Penguin Books. ISBN 978-0-14-100346-7.
- Peakman, Julie (2013). The Pleasure's All Mine: A History of Perverse Sex. London: Reaktion Books. ISBN 978-1-7802-3185-3.
- Shoemaker, Robert (2004). The London Mob: Violence and Disorder in Eighteenth-Century England. London and New York: Hambledon and London. ISBN 978-1-8528-5389-1.
- Storey, Neil D. (2007). London: Crime, Death and Debauchery. Stroud, Gloucestershire: Sutton Publishing. ISBN 978-0-7509-4624-7.
- Swift, Theophilus (1790). The Monster at Large: Or, the Innocence of Rhynwick Williams Vindicated: In a Letter to Sir Francis Buller. London: R. Butters. OCLC 506051800.
- Williams, Renwick (1792). An Appeal to the Public, by Rhynwick Williams, Containing Observations and Reflections on Facts, Relative to his very Extraordinary and Melancholy Case. London: Privately printed. OCLC 642650766.

==== Journals and magazines ====
- Heydt, Bruce (2004). "The 'London Monster' Sentenced to Six Years in Newgate Prison". British Heritage. Vol. 25, no. 1. pp. 14–18.
- Bondeson, Jan (2001). "Monsters and Moral Panic in London". History Today. Vol. 51, no. 5. pp. 30–35.
- King, Peter (2009). "Making Crime News: Newspapers, Violent Crime and the Selective Reporting of Old Bailey Trials in the late Eighteenth Century". Crime, Histoire & Sociétés / Crime, History & Societies. 13 (1): 91–116. doi:10.4000/chs.695.
- "Untitled". The General Magazine. No. 4. 1790. pp. 282–283.

==== Newspapers ====
- "Public Office, Bow Street". The Times. 15 June 1790.
- "Untitled". The Times. 7 March 1788. p. 3.
- "Untitled". The World. 11 May 1790. p. 3.

==== Websites ====
- Clark, Gregory (28 April 2018). "Average Earnings and Retail Prices, UK, 1209–2017" (PDF). MeasuringWorth. Archived from the original (PDF) on 26 July 2023.
- Clark, Gregory (2023). "The Annual RPI and Average Earnings for Britain, 1209 to Present (New Series)". MeasuringWorth.
- Mullin, Katherine (2007). "Swift, Theophilus". Oxford Dictionary of National Biography (online ed.). Oxford University Press. doi:10.1093/ref:odnb/26835. (Subscription, Wikipedia Library access or UK public library membership required.)
- "Rhynwick Williams. Breaking Peace; wounding. 8th July 1790". Old Bailey Proceedings Online. Archived from the original on 3 March 2025.
- "Rhynwick Williams. Breaking Peace; wounding, Breaking Peace; wounding, Breaking Peace; wounding. 8th December 1790". Old Bailey Proceedings Online.
