= Piquerism =

Sexual interest in penetrating another person's skin

Piquerism (derived from the French piquer—"to prick") refers to a sexual interest in penetrating the skin of another person with sharp objects (such as pins, razors, knives, etc.). Sometimes, this is serious enough to cause extreme injuries or even death. Piquerism is a paraphilia as well as a form of sadism. The most frequently targeted areas of the body are the breasts, buttocks, and groin.

== Examples ==
=== Jack the Ripper ===
Robert D. Keppel and his colleagues concluded in an analysis of London's Jack the Ripper murders of 1888 that "the injuries sustained by the victims displayed the signature characteristic of picquerism."

=== Andrei Chikatilo ===
A Soviet serial killer who operated in the late 70s and early 80s, the Rostov Ripper, after he murdered his first victim, 9 year old Yelena Zakotnova, was able to achieve erection and orgasm only upon the stabbing and slashing of women and children to death.

=== Graham Dwyer ===
A convicted Irish murderer, revealed at trial to have expressed an overwhelming interest in, and who carried out a murder for sexual gratification by stabbing Elaine O'Hara. He also had videos recorded by himself on a personal harddrive, showing sexual intercourse with victims he met through fetish websites where stabbing took place during these encounters.

=== Frank Ranier ===
A 25-year old American was arrested in June 2007 for bribing multiple young females with large sums of money in exchange for poking their buttocks with sharp objects.

== See also ==
- London Monster
- Halifax Slasher
- "Pique", an episode of Law & Order: Special Victims Unit with piquerism as a main plot element
