= Goodeve =

Goodeve may refer to:

== People ==
- Arthur Samuel Goodeve (1860–1920), Canadian pharmacist and politician
- Charles F. Goodeve (1904–1980), Canadian chemist and pioneer in operations research
- Florence Everilda Goodeve (1861–1915), English composer and lyricist
- Grant Goodeve (born 1952), American actor and television host
- Thyrza Nichols Goodeve, American writer, artist, and interviewer

== Places ==
- Goodeve, Saskatchewan
