= Garrow's Law =

2009 British legal drama TV series

- Genre: Legal drama Period drama
- Created by: Tony Marchant
- Starring: Andrew Buchan; Alun Armstrong; Lyndsey Marshal; Rupert Graves; Aidan McArdle; Michael Culkin
- Theme music composer: Edmund Butt
- Composers: Edmund Butt; Charlie Mole
- Country of origin: United Kingdom
- Original language: English
- No. of series: 3
- No. of episodes: 12

Production
- Executive producers: Jamie Isaacs; Mark Bell
- Producer: Dominic Barlow
- Production locations: Edinburgh and Glasgow
- Cinematography: Lukas Strebel (Series 1) Gavin Struthers (Series 2)
- Running time: 60 minutes
- Production companies: Twenty Twenty; Shed Media Scotland

Original release
- Network: BBC One; BBC HD
- Release: 1 November 2009 – 4 December 2011

Garrow's Law is a British period legal drama about the 18th-century lawyer William Garrow. The series debuted on 1 November 2009 on BBC One and BBC HD television. A second series was announced on 7 July 2010 and was broadcast from 14 November 2010. A third series consisting of four episodes was commissioned and was aired from 13 November 2011. Garrow's Law was cancelled after three series in February 2012.

== Summary ==
Set around trials at the Old Bailey in Georgian London against a backdrop of corruption and social injustice, Garrow's Law is a legal drama inspired by the life of pioneering barrister William Garrow.

The series, co-created by Tony Marchant, is based on real legal cases from the late 18th century, as recorded in the Old Bailey Proceedings. Andrew Buchan as Garrow leads a cast including Alun Armstrong and Lyndsey Marshal.

From rape and murder to high treason and corruption, each episode begins with the investigation of a real crime sourced from the published accounts of Old Bailey trials, available in a fully searchable edition online. In an age when few of the accused could afford defence counsel, the youthful Garrow and his associate John Southouse (pronounced soot-house), a solicitor, work to uncover the truth or fight for justice, championing the underdog and pioneering the rigorous cross-examination of prosecution witnesses that paved the way for the modern legal system.

A gifted maverick, at times arrogant and with a burning sense of destiny, Garrow is driven to change the nature of the trial, thereby creating powerful enemies both in the corrupt underworld and among the political elite.

A major subplot running through the series concerns Garrow's relationship with Lady Sarah Hill, an aristocratic figure with an interest in justice and the law. This almost cost Garrow his life in episode three when Garrow challenges Silvester, his main courtroom rival, to a duel when Silvester insinuates that Garrow and Lady Sarah's relationship has become intimate and then refuses to withdraw the allegation. Lady Sarah's husband is Sir Arthur Hill, an important politician and member of the government. The storyline continues when Sir Arthur accuses his wife of adultery with Garrow and refuses Lady Sarah her son by claiming him as his property. The subplot concludes in the last episode of series three.

As well as William Garrow, the series also includes other non-fictional characters, most notably Sir Francis Buller, a controversial judge of the age, and barrister John Silvester. However, the series is not a biographical documentary, and Garrow was not actually involved in all of the cases depicted. According to Mark Pallis, the story editor of Garrow's Law, the show "aims to give viewers a real sense of what life was like in legal London towards the end of the 18th century; to give people a chance to experience the big legal landmarks and the cases that caused a stir at the time." The rolling subplot involving Garrow's relationship with Lady Sarah Hill is based on his real relationship with Sarah Dore, who had previously had a child with Sir Arthur Hill, Bt., Viscount Fairford, but departs significantly from the facts, as she was never married to Hill.

== Cast and characters ==
=== Main ===
- Andrew Buchan as William Garrow
- Alun Armstrong as John Southouse
- Lyndsey Marshal as Lady Sarah Hill
- Rupert Graves as Sir Arthur Hill, Bt
- Aidan McArdle as Silvester
- Michael Culkin as Judge Buller

=== Recurring ===
- Anthony Bowers as Court Clerk
- Stephen Boxer as Viscount Melville
- Anton Lesser as John Farmer
- Harry Melling as George Pinnock

== Episode list ==
=== Series one ===
No.	Title	Directed by	Written by	Original release date	Viewers (millions)
1	"Episode 1"	Peter Lydon	Tony Marchant	4.98	1 November 2009
After losing his first case of defending a man accused by notorious thief-taker Edward Forrester of highway robbery, idealistic barrister William Garrow is instructed to defend a serving girl accused of infanticide of her own baby at childbirth. Guest starring: Frances Grey as Mary Pace; Finlay Robertson as Peter Pace; Julie Hale as Mrs Browning; Teresa Churcher as Mrs Tarling; Tessa Nicholson as Elizabeth Jarvis; Steven Waddington as Forrester
2	"Episode 2"	Peter Lydon	Tony Marchant	3.92 (overnight)	8 November 2009
Garrow, now a celebrated Old Bailey barrister defends the case of a man accused of being the infamous London Monster, responsible for stabbing several young ladies in London. Newspaper proprietor John Julius Angerstein offers a reward for the killer being brought before the courts. Guest starring: Nicholas Day as John Julius Angerstein; Cara Kelly as Agnes Williams; Joel Gillman as Renwick Williams; Jessica Raine as Ann Porter; Richard Lumsden as Surgeon Tomkins
3	"Episode 3"	Peter Lydon	Stephen Russell	4.47 (overnight)	15 November 2009
After more derision from Silvester, Garrow is spurred on to successfully defending Edgar Cole who is clearly guilty of raping a servant. This disgusts Lady Sarah and Southouse and matters become worse when Garrow fights a pistol duel with Silvester. In a second case, Garrow again confronts Forrester, defending a couple accused by him; they are saved from hanging, while Forrester is found guilty of perjury, and is stoned to death while pilloried. Guest starring: Sean Biggerstaff as Tom; James Bradshaw as Edgar Cole; Alexia Healy as Phebe; Barbara Rafferty as Katherine Stanton; Steven Waddington as Forrester
4	"Episode 4"	Peter Lydon	Damian Wayling	4.12 (overnight)	22 November 2009
Joseph Hamer is accused of treason and Garrow has the task of defending him against false evidence and a government determined to see him hanged. This episode appears to be based on the 1795 trials of Thomas Hardy (the first secretary of the London Corresponding Society) and John Horne Tooke, in which Garrow was part of the prosecution team who failed to secure a conviction. Thomas Erskine defended. Guest starring: Kate Dickie as Mary Hamer; Paul Hilton as Joseph Hamer; Oliver Boot as Charles Lynam; Peter Symonds as Sir John Scott

=== Series two ===
No.	Title	Directed by	Written by	Original release date	Viewers (millions)
5	"Episode 1"	Ashley Pearce	Tony Marchant	5.68	14 November 2010
When 133 slaves are thrown off a slave ship after its water supply runs low, Garrow takes on the brutal slave trade that regards human beings as cargo when he is employed by Liverpool Assurance to prosecute the ship's captain for a fraudulent claim of £4000 for loss of cargo. He is aided by anti-slavery campaigner Gustavus Vassa. (In history the insurance company refused to pay out, but the captain died shortly after and so was not put on trial.) Guest starring: Jasper Britton as Captain Collingwood; Danny Sapani as Gustavus Vassa
6	"Episode 2"	Ashley Pearce	Tony Marchant	5.34	21 November 2010
Garrow defends a man, Captain Jones, of the capital offence of sodomy but the client and witnesses prove unreliable mirroring accusations fabricated against himself and Lady Sarah. Guest starring: Liz White as Isabella Jasker; Matthew McNulty as David Jasker; Andrew Scott as Robert Jones
7	"Episode 3"	Ashley Pearce	Tony Marchant	5.52	28 November 2010
Garrow defends a British sailor imprisoned in Newgate for exposing ill treatment of sailors at the Greenwich Hospital by attacking the Admiralty and in particular its undersecretary Sir Arthur Hill, Lady Sarah's husband. At the beginning the episode also refers to the story of the celestial bed. Guest starring: Ron Cook as Captain Baillie; Emma Davies as Lady Elisabeth Fox
8	"Episode 4"	Ashley Pearce	Damian Wayling	5.37	5 December 2010
Garrow is in the dock accused by Sir Arthur Hill of 'criminal conversation' (adultery) with his wife Lady Sarah. The evidence against him is a combination of half truths, invention and lies, but with the moralistic Judge Kenyon, a censorious public, and Silvester's offer to defend him the truth may not be enough. Guest starring: Emma Davies as Lady Elisabeth Fox; Samuel West as Thomas Erskine; Benny Young as Judge Kenyon

=== Series three ===
No.	Title	Directed by	Written by	Original release date	Viewers (millions)
9	"Episode 1"	Bryn Higgins	Tony Marchant	5.51	13 November 2011
Taking on the case of James Hadfield, who is charged with high treason for attempting to assassinate King George III, Garrow tries an insanity defence though Hadfield does not fit the legal standard. Guest starring: Mark Letheren as James Hadfield
10	"Episode 2"	Bryn Higgins	David Lawrence	5.05	20 November 2011
Garrow's defence of two Spitalfields silk weavers charged with industrial sabotage becomes complicated when one turns King's Evidence against the other. Southouse falls ill with gaol fever. Guest starring: Ruaidhri Conroy as Ciaran Quinn; Nora Jane Noone as Catherine Quinn; Hugh O'Conor as Cathal Foley
11	"Episode 3"	Bryn Higgins	Kevin Hood	4.77	27 November 2011
While prosecuting Thomas Picton for approving the use of torture as governor of Trinidad, Garrow is offered a deal by Lord Melville in exchange for helping Lady Sarah gain custody of her son. Southouse's condition takes a turn for the worse and he advises Lady Sarah to take her son from Sir Arthur's home. Guest starring: Patrick Baladi as Thomas Picton; Sasha Frost as Luisa Calderon; Will Keen as William Fullarton
12	"Episode 4"	Bryn Higgins	Damian Wayling	4.80	4 December 2011
Garrow successfully defends a man falsely accused of murder at a polling day riot. Approached by the victim's daughter Garrow agrees to find and prosecute the real murderer putting himself in grave danger from the man's colleagues and chief magistrate of the constabulary. Lady Sarah seeks documents to discredit Lord Melville and legally regain her son. Guest starring: Blake Ritson as Charles Fox

== Home media ==
=== iTunes release ===
Garrow's Law was released on the iTunes Store on 1 November 2009.

=== DVD ===
The first series of Garrow's Law was released on DVD on 4 January 2010 and the second on 7 February 2011. Series Three was released on 6 February 2012.
