= Halifax Slasher =

Purported violent criminal active in England in the winter of 1938

The Halifax Slasher was the supposed attacker in an incident of mass hysteria that occurred in the town of Halifax, England, in November 1938 following a series of reported attacks on local people, mostly women. The hysteria spread elsewhere and was partly blamed on a previous slashing event in the 1920s.

== Background ==
The week-long scare began after Mary Gledhill and Gertrude Watts claimed to have been attacked by a mysterious man with a mallet and "bright buckles" on his shoes. Five days later, Mary Sutcliffe reported an attack on herself. Reports of attacks by a 'mysterious man' with a knife or a razor continued, and the nickname "the Halifax Slasher" stuck. The situation became so serious that Scotland Yard was called in to assist the Halifax police.

Vigilante groups were set up on the streets, and several people, mistakenly assumed to have been the attacker, were beaten up; business in the town was all but shut down. Rewards for the capture of the attacker were promised; reports came of more attacks in nearby cities. The panic spread so much that vigilante gangs were roaming the streets of the town and after Hilda Lodge was 'attacked', Clifford Edwards, a local man who had gone to help, was later accused of being the slasher himself. Soon a mob had gathered and after they had started to chant for his death, police had to escort him home.

In the evening of 29 November, Percy Waddington, who had reported an attack, admitted that he had inflicted the damage upon himself. Others soon made similar admissions, and the Scotland Yard investigation concluded there were no "Slasher" attacks. Five local people were subsequently charged with public mischief offences and four were sent to prison.

On 2 December, the Halifax Courier ran this story:

Carry on Halifax! The Slasher scare is over... The theory that a half-crazed, wild-eyed man has been wandering around, attacking helpless women in dark streets, is exploded... There never was, nor is there likely to be, any real danger to the general public. There is no doubt that following certain happenings public feeling has grown, and that many small incidents have been magnified in the public mind until a real state of alarm was caused. This assurance that there is no real cause for alarm, in short, no properly authenticated wholesale attacks by such a person as the bogy man known as the 'Slasher', should allay the public fear...

Halifax had suffered from slasher attacks before, when in 1927, James Leonard was convicted of stalking and slashing the clothes of six women in the town. He was given a six-month sentence, however, he was quickly ruled out of the 1938 attacks on account of his large nose, which none of the 1938 victims had described.

== Timeline of purported attacks ==
- 16 November – Mary Gledhill and Gertrude Watts claimed to be attacked by a man with a mallet.
- 21 November – Mary Sutcliffe claimed to have been attacked.
- 24 November – Clayton Aspinall reported an attack.
- 25 November – Percy Waddington was "attacked."
- 25 November – Hilda Lodge "attacked," also Clifford Edwards attacked by a vigilante mob.
- 27 November – Beatrice Sorrel reported attack.
- 27 November – Fred Baldwin attacked by a group of drunken vigilantes.
- 29 November – Margaret Kenny claimed an attack by a "well-built man with a broad face, wearing very lightweight shoes, and what felt like a dirty mackintosh (a trenchcoat worn by a flasher)." Mary Sutcliffe reported a second attack, and Winifred McCall claimed to be attacked. Attacks in Manchester and Bradford were also reported. Percy Waddington, who claimed to have been attacked, admitted he inflicted the damage to himself, effectively ending the scare.
- 30 November, 1 and 2 December – Claims of attacks in other cities including London were dismissed.

== See also ==
- London Monster
- Mad Gasser of Mattoon
