= Einstein and the Bomb =

2024 British television docudrama

- Genre: Docudrama
- Written by: Philip Ralph
- Directed by: Anthony Philipson
- Starring: Aidan McArdle
- Composer: Tom Hodge
- Country of origin: United Kingdom
- Original language: English

Production
- Executive producers: Andrew Cohen; James Van Der Pool
- Producer: Samantha Lewis
- Editor: Simon Barker
- Running time: 76 minutes
- Production company: BBC Studios

Original release
- Network: Netflix
- Release: 16 February 2024

Einstein and the Bomb is a 2024 BBC television/Netflix docudrama film portraying the events after Albert Einstein left Nazi Germany in 1932. The film would stream worldwide on Netflix on 16 February 2024.

== Synopsis ==
Using Einstein's own words from speeches, letters and interviews, the film documents Einstein's creation of the theory of relativity, his escape from the Nazi regime, living in Norfolk and later Long Island, and his relationship with the creation of the atomic bomb. The relationship between Einstein and the people at the Roughton camp in Norfolk is partly based on a non-fiction book by Stuart McLaren Saving Einstein. When Norfolk Hid a Genius.

== Cast ==
- Aidan McArdle as Albert Einstein
- Andrew Havill as Commander Locker-Lampson
- Rachel Barry as Margery Howard
- Helena Westerman as Barbara Goodhall
- Leo Ashizawa as Katsu Hara

== Reception ==
The film became the fourth most-watched English film between 12 and 18 February, with 10.9 million hours viewed.

On Rotten Tomatoes, the film has a 83% rating based on 12 reviews. Chris Vognar of Rolling Stone wrote a positive review of the film, praising its storytelling, editing and bringing a human dimension to the historical events.
