= Philip Carteret =

Royal Navy officer and explorer (1733–1796)

Rear-Admiral Philip Carteret
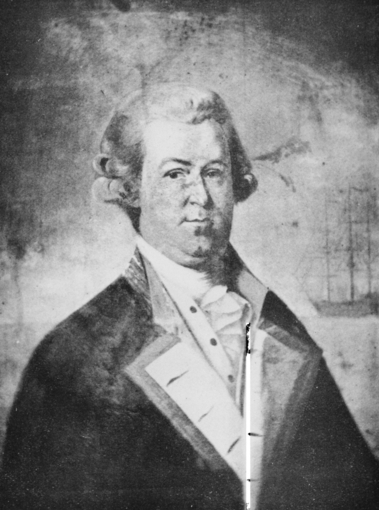
- Born: 22 January 1733; Trinity Manor, Jersey
- Died: 21 July 1796 (aged 63); Southampton, England
- Burial place: All Saints' Church, Southampton
- Relatives: Carteret family
- Military career
- Allegiance: Great Britain
- Branch: Royal Navy
- Service years: 1747–1794
- Rank: Rear-Admiral
- Commands: Swallow; Endymion

Rear-Admiral Philip Carteret, Seigneur of Trinity (22 January 1733 – 21 July 1796) was a Royal Navy officer and explorer who participated in two of the British navy's circumnavigation expeditions in 1764–66 and 1766–69.

== Biography ==
Carteret was the son of Charles de Carteret, Seigneur of Trinity, and his wife Frances-Mary S. Paul. Carteret entered the navy in 1747, serving aboard the Salisbury, and then under Captain John Byron from 1751 to 1755. Between 1757 and 1758 he was in the Guernsey on the Mediterranean Station. As a lieutenant in the Dolphin he accompanied Byron during his voyage of circumnavigation, from June 1764 to May 1766.

In 1766 he was made a commander and given the command of HMS Swallow to circumnavigate the world, as consort to the Dolphin under the command of Samuel Wallis. The two ships were parted shortly after sailing through the Strait of Magellan, Carteret discovering Pitcairn Island and the Carteret Islands, which were subsequently named after him. In 1767, he also discovered a new archipelago inside Saint George's Channel (Papua New Guinea) between New Ireland and New Britain Islands (Papua New Guinea) and named it Duke of York Islands, as well as rediscovered the Solomon Islands first sighted by the Spaniard Álvaro de Mendaña in 1568, and the Juan Fernández Islands first discovered by Juan Fernández in 1574. Weakened by severe illness, he arrived back in England, at Spithead, on 20 March 1769, having been ably assisted by Lieutenant Erasmus Gower who was, for much of the voyage, the only fit person on board Swallow who could navigate.

The following year he returned to Jersey as seigneur of Trinity and took part in Jersey politics. He was promoted to post-captain in 1771 and was in London on 5 May 1772, when he married Mary Rachel Silvester (1741–1815), a doctor's daughter. Four of their five children survived to adulthood, including:

- the second son, Philip Carteret Silvester (1777–1828), entered the navy like his father and inherited a baronetcy from his maternal uncle Sir John Silvester
- a daughter, Elizabeth Mary (1774 – 21 September 1851, Yarmouth), in 1818 became the third wife of William Symonds, Surveyor of the Navy.

Carteret's health was ruined by his voyage of exploration, and he received little reward from the Admiralty. He did not have the patrons which were necessary for naval promotion at this time, and this and his complaints before the voyage on the Swallow's ill-suitedness to the voyage ensured that his requests for a new ship in 1769 fell on deaf ears. Put on half-pay, the petition for increasing half-pay which he got together helped many officers, but not Carteret himself. In the meantime, in 1773, his journals of the voyage were published as part of An Account of the Voyages undertaken by Byron, Wallis, Carteret and Cook, but that volume's editor John Hawkesworth made many changes to his account and so Carteret drafted a correct version of his own (which, however, only got published in 1965, by the Hakluyt Society).

His new ship, HMS Endymion, at last came on 1 August 1779 and despite problems in the Channel, off Senegal and off the Leeward Islands (at the last of which Carteret was nearly killed in a hurricane) he arrived in the West Indies as instructed. Despite having a share in four prize ships, he was paid off and the Endymion transferred to another captain. All his petitions for a new ship were unsuccessful and he had a stroke in 1792, retiring to Southampton in 1794 with the rank of rear admiral. He died there two years later and was buried in the catacombs of All Saints' Church, Southampton. In 1940 the church was destroyed by German bombing. In 1944 the bodies beneath it were reburied in Hollybrook Cemetery in Southampton.

== See also ==
- European and American voyages of scientific exploration

== Sources ==
- Cock, Randolph (2007). "Wallis, Samuel, and Philip Carteret". The Oxford Companion to World Exploration. Oxford University Press. ISBN 978-0-19-514922-7.
