= Philip Ralph =

English screenwriter, playwright and actor (born 20th century)

- Occupations: Television screenwriter, playwright and actor
- Known for: Doctors; Einstein and the Bomb
- Website: philipralph.com

Philip Ralph is an English television screenwriter, playwright and actor.

== Career ==
Ralph began as an actor, having graduated from RADA in 1992. He appeared in small roles on series such as Pie in the Sky, North & South and The Shadow Line.

He wrote the plays Mr. Nobody in 2003, and a one-man show, Hitting Funny, in 2005. In 2008, he wrote the military drama play Deep Cut, which played at the Tricycle Theatre. He also moved into television writing around this time, becoming a prolific writer for the BBC One soap opera Doctors, writing 73 episodes. He also wrote for Casualty and its spinoff, Holby City, and in 2026, wrote for the thirteenth series of the crime drama Father Brown.

Ralph has also written docudramas, such as BBC Two's 8 Days to the Moon and Back (2019), and Einstein and the Bomb (2024) for Netflix. In 2026, it was announced Ralph would write Suspect: Kate McCann, a film about the aftermath of the disappearance of Madeleine McCann, for Channel 5.

In March 2024, following the announcement of the cancellation of Doctors by the BBC, an X thread by Ralph, criticizing the decision and discussing problems in British television, went viral and got mainstream press attention. In a follow-up interview with The Guardian, Ralph further discussed the considerable damage the loss of the programme would inflict on jobs in British television, as well as the continued financial contraction of the industry.

== Writing credits ==
Year	Title	Notes	Broadcaster
2005–2024	Doctors	73 episodes	BBC One
2012	Holby City	2 episodes	BBC One
2019	8 Days to the Moon and Back	TV Movie	BBC Two/PBS
2022	Casualty	Episode: "Judgement Call"	BBC One
2024	Einstein and the Bomb	TV Movie	Netflix
2026	Father Brown	Episode: "The Power of Suggestion"	BBC One
2026	Suspect: Kate McCann	TV Movie	Channel 5
