= Florence Everilda Goodeve =

English composer and lyricist

Florence Everilda Goodeve c. 1895

Florence Everilda Goodeve (24 May 1848 – 15 January 1916) was an English composer and lyricist, often credited as Mrs Arthur Goodeve.

== Early and personal life ==
She was born Florence Everilda Knowlys in Heysham, Lancashire. Her father Thomas John Knowlys (b. 1803; died by 1869) and mother Anna Maria Martha née Hesketh (1809–1886) were married in September 1828, and built a large edifice they named Heysham Tower in the area, which is now the site of the Midland Hotel, Morecambe. Her father was nephew of Newman Knowlys and her mother was sister of Peter Hesketh-Fleetwood. She was the youngest of four sons and six daughters, one of whom died in infancy. She married Louis Arthur Goodeve (1841–1888) on 23 November 1869 at Christ Church, Clifton Down, wearing "a simple tulle veil" and attended by seventeen bridesmaids. She accompanied her husband to Calcutta, where he was an advocate in the High Court; they had five children. Florence died in London.

== Music and art ==
Florence evinced a musical talent at an early age and at the age of fourteen she wrote her "Glockenspiel Galop" and several songs. It was heard by Virginia Gabriel who persuaded her to have it published. Altogether she published about 70 songs. Some of her most popular were, "Ah, Well-a-Day," "The Jovial Beggar," and "Fiddle and I."

Her later compositions included "Song of the Rivers," "In the Silver Years," "I Would Not Love You Less," "Row, Row," a boating song, "If Thou Must Love Me," and "The King's Wooing," a baritone song, written for Robert Watkin-Mills.

Besides being a musician, Goodeve was an amateur painter, and she also contributed to several magazines.
