= Philip Carteret Silvester =

Royal Navy officer (1777–1828)

Captain Sir Philip Carteret Silvester Bt CB
- Born: Philip Carteret; 1777
- Died: 24 August 1828 (aged 50–51); Leamington Spa, Warwickshire
- Burial place: All Saints Church, Leamington Spa
- Relatives: Philip Carteret (father)
- Military career
- Allegiance: Great Britain; United Kingdom
- Branch: Royal Navy
- Service years: 1792–1828
- Rank: Captain
- Commands: HMS Bonne Citoyenne; HMS Scorpion; HMS Naiad; HMS Pomone; HMS Desiree
- Conflicts: French Revolutionary Wars; Cornwallis's Retreat (WIA); Napoleonic Wars; Walcheren Campaign

Captain Sir Philip Carteret Silvester, 2nd Baronet, CB (1777 – 24 August 1828) was a Royal Navy officer who served in the French Revolutionary and Napoleonic Wars.

== Early life ==
He was the son of Rear-admiral Philip Carteret, the circumnavigator, by his wife Mary Rachel, daughter of Sir John Baptist Silvester, M.D., F.R.S. (d. 1789), a Frenchman by birth, a Dutchman by education, and physician to the army in the Low Countries, under the Duke of Cumberland, during the War of the Austrian Succession (cf. Munk, Coll. of Phys. ii. 178).

== Career ==
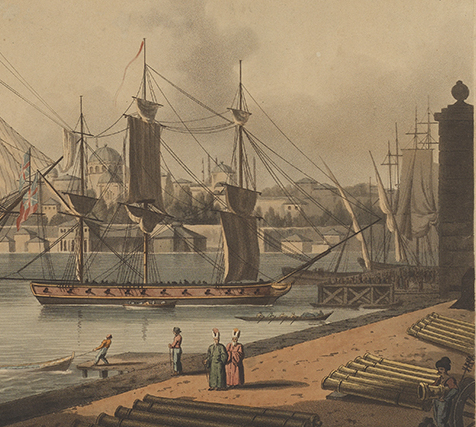
HMS Bonne Citoyenne, Carteret's first command

Carteret entered the navy in 1792, under the care of his father's old lieutenant, Captain Erasmus Gower, on board Lion, in which he went out to China, and returned in 1794. He was then with Gower in the Triumph, and was slightly wounded in the partial engagement with the French fleet on 17 June 1795. On 8 October 1795 he was promoted to be lieutenant of the Impérieuse, frigate; he afterwards served in the Greyhound, Britannia, and Cambrian, in the Channel and on the coast of France; and on 29 April 1802 was promoted to be commander of the sloop HMS Bonne Citoyenne in the Mediterranean. She was paid off in 1803, and in 1804 Carteret was appointed to the 18-gun brig Scorpion, in which he was actively employed in the North Sea; and on 11 April 1805 captured a Dutch vessel bound for the West Indies with a cargo of arms and military stores.

In December 1805 he was sent out to the West Indies, where, during the greater part of 1806, he was engaged in watching and sending intelligence of the French squadron under Willaumez, so that it was not till his return to England in the spring of 1807 that he received his commission as post-captain, dated 22 January 1806.

In 1809 he served as a volunteer on board the Superb, bearing the flag of Sir Richard Goodwin Keats, in the expedition to the Scheldt, where his conduct, especially in covering the evacuation of Walcheren, was highly commended by Sir Richard John Strachan, the commander-in-chief, and Commodore Owen, in actual command of the operations. In the summer of 1811 Carteret was appointed to the Naiad, a 46-gun frigate, in which on 20 September he was off Boulogne when a division of the French flotilla got under way and stood along the coast, under the eyes of Napoleon I, who, on the next day, witnessed a detachment of this division cut off, brought to action, and captured by the Naiad, with three gun brigs in company. The rest of the division escaped under the guns of the batteries which lined the coast.

Towards the close of 1812 Carteret was moved into the Pomone, a frigate of the same force as the Naiad, employed on the coast of France and the Lisbon station. On 21 October 1813, in hazy weather in the Bay of Biscay, she fell in with a French frigate under jury masts, much disabled by a recent gale, and at the same time sighted another large ship, which was supposed to be also a frigate. Carteret ran down to engage this, only to find that she was a Portuguese East Indiaman; and meanwhile the disabled French frigate had made good her escape, only to be captured, after very feeble resistance, two days later by the Andromache. At Lisbon it was reported that the Pomone had fled from the frigate, and Carteret applied for a court-martial, which was held, on his return to Plymouth, on 31 December Carteret was acquitted of all blame, and continued in command of the Pomone till the end of the war. On 4 June 1815 he was nominated a C.B., and about the same time was appointed to the Désirée, from which in October he was moved to the Active. In her he served for two years on the Jamaica station.

After his return in the autumn of 1817 he had no further employment. In January 1822 he took the name of Silvester in addition to Carteret. On the death of his uncle, Sir John Silvester, 1st Baronet without issue, on 30 March 1822, he succeeded to the baronetcy by a special clause in the patent.

== Death ==
He died unmarried at Leamington on 24 August 1828, when the title became extinct.

Baronetage of the United Kingdom
Preceded by John Silvester	Baronet (of Yardley); 1822–1828	Extinct
