= Mad Gasser of Mattoon =

1944 Mass hysteria incident in Mattoon, IL

The Mad Gasser of Mattoon (also known as the Phantom Anesthetist, or simply the Mad Gasser) was the name given to an event of alleged mass hysteria in which a person or people allegedly committed a series of apparent gas attacks in Mattoon, Illinois, during the mid-1940s. More than two dozen separate cases of gassings were reported to police over the span of two weeks, in addition to many more reported sightings of the suspected assailant. The gasser's supposed victims reported smelling strange odors in their homes which were soon followed by symptoms such as paralysis of the legs, coughing, nausea and vomiting. No one died or had serious medical consequences as a result of the gas attacks.

Police remained skeptical of the accounts throughout the entire incident. Many reported gassings had simple explanations, such as spilled nail polish or odors emanating from animals or local factories. Victims made quick recoveries from their symptoms and suffered no long-term effects. Nevertheless, local newspapers ran alarmist articles about the reported attacks and treated the accounts as fact.

Although the explanation that the reports were only a case of mass hysteria is widely accepted, others maintain that a Mad Gasser actually existed.

== Descriptions ==
Most contemporary descriptions of the Mad Gasser are based on the testimony of Mr. Bert Kearney of 1408 Marshall Avenue, the husband of the victim of the first Mattoon case to be reported by the media. His wife, who was the one claiming to be attacked, did not describe seeing a prowler. He described the gasser as being a tall, thin man dressed in dark clothing and wearing a tight-fitting cap. Another report, made some weeks later, described the gasser as being a female dressed as a man. The Gasser had also been described as carrying a flit gun, an agricultural tool for spraying pesticide, which he purportedly used to expel the gas.

== Reported attacks ==
The first of the 1944 gasser incidents occurred at a house on Grant Avenue, Mattoon, on August 31, 1944. Urban Raef was awakened during the early hours of the morning by a strange odor. He felt nauseated and weak, and suffered from a fit of vomiting. Suspecting that he was suffering from domestic gas poisoning, Raef's wife wanted to check the kitchen stove to see if there was a problem with the pilot light, but found that she was partially paralyzed and unable to leave her bed.

Later that night (some contemporary accounts refer to the time as the morning of the following day), a similar incident was also reported by a young mother living close by. She was awakened by the sound of her daughter coughing but found herself unable to leave her bed.

The next day, September 1, there was another reported incident. Aline Kearney, of Marshall Avenue, Mattoon, reported smelling a strong, sweet odor around 11:00 pm. At first she dismissed the smell, believing it to be from flowers outside of the window, but the odor soon became stronger and she began to lose feeling in her legs. Kearney panicked and her calls attracted her sister, Mrs. Ready, who was in the house at the time. Mrs. Ready also noticed the odor, and determined that it was coming from the direction of the bedroom window, which was open at the time. The police were contacted, but no evidence of a prowler was found. At around 12:30 am, Bert Kearney, Aline Kearney's husband (a local taxi driver who had been absent during the time of the attack), returned home to find an unidentified man hiding close to one of the house's windows. The man fled and Kearney was unable to catch him. Kearney's description of the prowler was of a tall man dressed in dark clothing, wearing a tight fitting cap. This description was reported in the local media, and became the common description of the gasser throughout the Mattoon incident. After the attack, Aline Kearney reported suffering from a burning sensation on her lips and throat, which were attributed to the effects of the gas.

Initially, it was suspected that robbery was the primary motive for the attack. At the time of the incidents, the Kearneys had a large sum of money in the house, and it was surmised that the prowler could have seen Aline Kearney and her sister counting it earlier that evening. Local newspapers incorrectly reported this incident as being the first gasser attack.

In the days following the Kearney attack, there were half a dozen similar attacks, though none of the purported victims were able to provide a clear description of the prowler, and no clues were found at the scene of the attacks. The first specimen of physical evidence was found on the night of September 5, when Carl and Beulah Cordes of North 21st Street returned home around 10:00 pm. After spending a few minutes in the house they noticed a piece of white cloth, slightly larger than a man's handkerchief, sitting on their porch next to the screen door. Beulah Cordes picked up the cloth and smelled it. As soon as she inhaled, she became violently ill. She described the effect as being similar to an electric shock. Her face quickly began to swell, she experienced a burning sensation in her mouth and throat, and began to vomit. As with other victims, she also reported feeling weak and experiencing partial paralysis of her legs. Beulah Cordes later hypothesized that the cloth had been left on the porch in order to knock out the family dog, which usually slept there, so that the prowler could gain access to the house unnoticed.

In addition to the cloth, a skeleton key, described as looking "well used", was reportedly found on the sidewalk adjacent to the porch, along with a large, almost empty, tube of lipstick. The cloth was analyzed by the authorities, but they found no chemicals on it that could explain Beulah Cordes' reaction.

The same night a second incident was reported, this time in North 13th Street, at the home of Mrs. Leonard Burrell. She reported seeing a stranger break in through her bedroom window and then attempt to gas her.

As public concern over the alleged gassings quickly rose, the FBI became involved, and the local police issued a statement calling on residents to avoid lingering in residential areas, and warning that groups set up to patrol for the gasser should be disbanded for reasons of public safety. Chief of Police C. E. Cole also warned concerned citizens to exercise due restraint when carrying or discharging firearms.

During this period, there was also an increase in physical evidence of attacks being reported, ranging from footprints allegedly being discovered underneath windows to tears being found in window screens.

The unease surrounding the community became so widespread that groups known as “chasers” would follow police cars to try and capture the possible assailant themselves. Many were armed in hopes of finding the gasser, and the concerned police began arresting these chasers in fear of them accidentally harming civilians.

Even outside the chaser groups, many became so fearful of the gasser that they would arm themselves. One woman even accidentally shot a hole in the wall of her home due to her panicked state of arming herself in fear of the gasser.

By September 12, local police had received so many false alarms (mostly from citizens believing that they smelled gas, or that they had seen a prowler) that they reduced the priority afforded to gasser reports and announced that the entire incident was likely the result of explainable occurrences exacerbated by public fears, and a sign of the anxiety felt by women while local men were on war service.

After the police announcement, gasser reports declined. The only incident of arguable note after that date was the case of Bertha Burch, who claimed she saw a gasser who was a woman dressed as a man.

Date	Victims	Location	Notes
August 31, 1944	Mr. and Mrs. Urban Raef	Grant Avenue	
Sep 1	Unnamed		Name not reported in the media
Sep 1	Mrs. Charles Rider	Prairie Avenue	
Sep 1	Aline Kearney	Marshall Avenue	First case reported in the media; most Gasser descriptions derive from this case
Sep 5	Mrs. Beulah Cordes	North 21st Street	Became ill after smelling cloth found on porch
Sep 5	Mrs. Leonard Burrell	North 13th Street	
Sep 6	Mrs. Laura Junken	Richmond Avenue	
Sep 6	Ardell Spangle	North 15th Street	
Sep 6	Mr. Fred Goble		Saw prowler believed to be Gasser
Sep 6	Mrs. Glenda Hendershott	South 14th Street	
Sep 6	Mr. Daniel Spohn	North 19th street	
Sep 6	Mrs. Cordie Taylor	Charleston Avenue	
Sep 6	Miss Frances Smith; Miss Maxine Smith	Moultrie Ave	
Sep 7	As Above	As Above	Saw blue vapor and heard a motorized buzzing sound believed to be from gassing machinery
Sep 8	Mr C.W. Driskell	DeWitt Avenue	
Sep 9	Mrs. Genevieve Haskell; Grayson Wayne Haskell; Mrs. Russell Bailey; Miss Katherine Tuzzo	Westwood	
Sep 9	Mrs. Lucy Stephens	North 32nd Street	
Sep 10	Unnamed	Champaign Avenue	Name not reported in the media
Sep 10	Unnamed	2112 Moultrie Avenue	Name not reported in the media
Sep 10	Miss Frances Smith; Miss Maxine Smith	Moultrie Ave	Third reported attack
Sep 13	Bertha Burch		Described gasser as being a woman dressed as a man; woman's footprints found at scene

(List incomplete)

== Explanations ==
There are three primary theories about the Mattoon Mad Gasser incident: mass hysteria, industrial pollution, or an actual physical assailant. The events have also been written about by authors on the paranormal.

=== Mass hysteria ===
Almost two weeks after the Mattoon attacks began, the local Commissioner of Public Health, Thomas V. Wright, announced that there had undoubtedly been a number of gassing incidents, but that many instances were likely due to hysteria: residents hearing of alarming events, and then panicking when confronted by an out-of-place odor or a shadow at the window; Wright stated:

There is no doubt that a gas maniac exists and has made a number of attacks. But many of the reported attacks are nothing more than hysteria. Fear of the gas man is entirely out of proportion to the menace of the relatively harmless gas he is spraying. The whole town is sick with hysteria.

On September 12, local Chief of Police C. E. Cole took Wright's hypothesis a step further, announcing that there had likely been no gas attacks at all, and that the reported incidents had probably been triggered by chemicals carried on the wind from nearby industrial facilities and then exacerbated by public panic.

Wright and Cole's diagnosis was given further validity in 1945 when the Journal of Abnormal and Social Psychology published "The 'phantom anesthetist' of Mattoon: a field study of mass hysteria" by Donald M. Johnson, which documented the Mattoon incident as a case study in mass hysteria. In 1959, his opinion was seconded by psychologist James P. Chaplin, and went on to form the basis for several subsequent studies of the phenomena of mass hysteria.

Most of the physical symptoms recorded during the Botetourt and Mattoon incidents (including choking, swelling of mucous membranes, and weakness/temporary paralysis) have all been suggested symptoms of hysteria. Some experts believe that the mass hysteria was fueled by the headline in the Mattoon Journal-Gazette, "Mrs. Kearney and Daughter First Victims," which assumed there would be more attacks.

=== Toxic waste or pollution ===
On September 12, Chief of Police Cole told a press conference that odors and symptoms reported may have been the result of pollutants or toxic waste released by nearby industrial plants, and speculated that carbon tetrachloride or trichloroethylene, both of which have a sweet odor and can induce symptoms similar to those reported by purported gasser victims, may have been the substance released.

In response to Cole's statement, Atlas-Imperial, the primary company implicated in this affair, released a statement of its own saying that their facility had only five gallons of carbon tetrachloride in stock, which was contained in firefighting equipment. Atlas-Imperial officials also denied that any quantities of trichloroethylene (an industrial solvent used by Atlas) could be responsible for sickness in the town, reasoning that it would have taken significant quantities of the chemical to sicken the townspeople, and that factory workers would have experienced similar symptoms long before anybody outside of the factory was affected.

At the time of the gassing, the Atlas plant had been certified as safe by the State Department of Health.

=== Actual assailant ===
The first theory of the attacks published in local newspapers and reported by police was that there was an actual assailant gassing the community. After analyzing events, some researchers have concluded that at least some of the gasser incidents were the work of an actual attacker who carried out a series of gassings as reported by witnesses. The description Mr. Kearney provided of the possible attacker was spread though nationwide media, and it was not until later that other theories were considered. The mayor of Mattoon, as well as experts in the Chemical Warfare Service considered possible gasses used such as mustard gas or chloropicrin, although the symptoms didn’t quite match up. The superintendent of the Illinois Bureau of Criminal Identification and Investigation, Richard Piper, even stated in a local newspaper:

"The existence of the anesthetic, or whatever it is, is genuine"

Even within this theory however, it is still debated whether there was an assailant for the duration of the gassing incidents or if it was at first before changing over time.

=== Other suggestions ===
Some writers on the paranormal have covered the events. Clark (1993) describes an illustration of the Gasser from Loren Coleman's Mysterious America: "[the artist] depicts him as a not-quite-human, possibly extraterrestrial, being".

== See also ==
- Fortean phenomena
- Nocebo
- Placebo
- Spring-heeled Jack
- Pérák, the Spring Man of Prague
- London Monster
