= Drawing the Line (play) =

2013 play by Howard Brenton

The regions affected by the extended Partition of India: green regions were all part of Pakistan by 1948, and orange part of India. The darker-shaded regions represent the Punjab and Bengal provinces partitioned by the Radcliffe Line. The grey areas represent some of the key princely states that were eventually integrated into India or Pakistan, but others which initially became independent are not shown.

Drawing the Line is a 2013 play by Howard Brenton, centred on Cyril Radcliffe and his part in the partition of India in 1947. It premiered from 3 December 2013 to 11 January 2014, in a production directed by Howard Davies at London's Hampstead Theatre.

== Storyline ==
Set in 1947, the play tells the story of Cyril Radcliffe and the boundary commission for the Punjab portion of the eponymous Radcliffe Line. “Ignorant of India, mathematics or map-reading, the principled Radcliffe finds himself the victim of despair, as well as Delhi belly, and enmeshed in a whole series of escalating conflicts.”

== Production history ==
The debut run of the play was completely sold out. Thousands of people from more than 80 countries also tuned in to watch the final performance streamed on the web in association with The Guardian.

== Critical reception ==
Reviews were generally positive though there were critiques of some embellishments to the story. Compliments included "brilliantly staged", "absorbing", and "giv[ing] a vivid picture of the pressures of the time". Criticisms included that the play "fails to soar" and "brushes the boundaries of caricature". In a review for The Independent, Paul Taylor praised the "lucid, elegant production" and said "Not all of it works (the handling of Gandhi feels stilted) but it's a fascinating play which views colonial culpability from an unexpected and singularly revealing angle."

The set design, by Tim Hatley, drew particular praise. Louise Burns, reviewing its online screening in April 2020, gave the 2014 production four stars. She said: "Hatley’s clever set design uses tall, patterned wood partitions to indicate a world of India and aside from strategically placed desks, chairs and props the space is sparse, allowing the story to unfold through precise acting and sharply constructed dialogue." In a four-starred review for the Financial Times, Sarah Hemming said: "Brenton is a masterly storyteller and the play expertly draws you into the maelstrom. Howard Davies’s skilful production, focused on the interiors (suggested by designer Tim Hatley through elegant filigree screens) in which the decisions will be made, makes you constantly aware of the turbulence outside".

Reviewing the 2020 online screening for The Arts Desk, Marianka Swain said that "The fleet-footed, elegant production is marshalled by the late Howard Davies, who maintains a fluidity to this series of short scenes by stressing the claustrophobia of the trapped Radcliffe, hemmed in by giant filigree screens (evocative design by Tim Hatley). Davies also strikes exactly the right tone for this dark farce: simultaneously ridiculous and horrifying."

== Portrayal of historical figures ==
In a live webchat, Howard Brenton answered questions about his acclaimed play and his career. Defending his portrayal of Cyril Radcliffe as a man who struggled with his conscience, Brenton said “There were clues that Radcliffe had a dark night of the soul in the bungalow: he refused to accept his fee, he did collect all the papers and draft maps, took them home to England and burnt them. And he refused to say a word, even to his family, about what happened. My playwright’s brain went into overdrive when I discovered these details.”

== See also ==
- Artistic depictions of the partition of India
- List of artistic depictions of Mahatma Gandhi
- Cyril Radcliffe, 1st Viscount Radcliffe
- Partition of India
- Radcliffe Line
