= Aidan McArdle =

Irish actor

- Born: Dublin, Ireland
- Occupation: Actor
- Spouse: Aislín McGuckin (divorced)
- Relatives: Steve Coogan (cousin)

Aidan McArdle is an Irish character actor. He is known for being a series regular in shows such as Beautiful People (2008–2009), Garrow's Law (2009–2011), and Mr Selfridge (2014–2015).

== Early life and education ==
Aidan McArdle was born in Dublin.

He attended Terenure College, later studying for an arts degree at University College Dublin. He went on to study at the Royal Academy of Dramatic Art in London, England.

== Career ==
=== Theatre ===
McArdle's work with the Royal Shakespeare Company includes the title role in Richard III and the role of Puck in A Midsummer Night's Dream. He also appeared in the title role of a stage adaptation of John Irving's A Prayer for Owen Meany by Simon Bent at London's Royal National Theatre in 2002, along with the role of Joseph Surface in Deborah Warner's 2011 The School for Scandal at the Barbican Centre.

=== Film ===
His first foray into the Hollywood film industry was as Slannen, an elf who secretly aspires to be a lawyer, in the 2004 movie Ella Enchanted.

=== Television ===
McArdle is well known for his numerous television roles, the majority of which are period roles. He played a number of roles in biographical TV films. These roles include Dudley Moore in the 2004 television movie Not Only But Always; Albert Einstein in the 2005 biography Einstein's Big Idea (aka E=mc²), and again in Einstein and the Bomb (2024); and Igor Stravinsky in the 2005 production Riot at the Rite.

In 2009 he appeared as a supporting character, Jewish anarchist Saul Landau, in an episode of the BBC TV series Casualty 1909.

McArdle starred in Garrow's Law as John Silvester, and in the comedy television series Beautiful People (2008–09) as Andy Doonan. In the British period drama Mr Selfridge about the founder of the department store Selfridges, he played Lord Loxley, who becomes an arch-enemy to Harry Selfridge. Another prominent role was as a defence lawyer in The Fall.

From 2022, he appeared in the ITV series Ridley.

== Personal life ==
McArdle married actress Aislín McGuckin and they have three children. They later divorced.

He is a cousin of Steve Coogan.

== Filmography ==
Year	Film	Role	Notes
2002	Casualty	James O'Hearne	TV series (1 episode: "Only the Lonely")
2002	Any Time Now	Nedser Fitzgibbon	TV series
2004	Judas	John the Baptist	TV movie
2004	Ella Enchanted	Slannen	
2004	No Angels	Conor Martin	TV series (1 episode: "Episode #1.9")
2004	Not Only But Always	Dudley Moore	TV movie
2005	Footprints in the Snow	Seamus	TV movie
2005	Nova	Albert Einstein	TV documentary (1 episode: "Einstein's Big Idea")
2005	Riot at the Rite	Igor Stravinsky	TV movie
2005	All About George	Dave	TV series (6 episodes)
2005	Perfect Day	Pete	TV movie
2006	Agatha Christie's Marple	Hugh Hornbeam	TV movie “Sleeping Murder”
2006	Comedy Lab	Aiden McCabe	TV series (1 episode: "Bad Crowd")
2006	Afterlife	Martin	TV series (1 episode: "Lullaby")
2006	Jane Eyre	John Eshton	TV mini-series (3 episodes)
2006	Perfect Day: The Millennium	Pete	TV movie
2007	The Afternoon Play	Dr. Max Freeman	TV series (1 episode: "Death Becomes Her")
2007	Green	Stuart	TV movie
2007	Heavenly Sword	Voice	Video Game
2008	The Duchess	Richard Sheridan	
2008	Me and Orson Welles	Martin Gabel (Cassius)	
2008	Secret Diary of a Call Girl	Officer Manager Mike	TV series (1 episode: "Episode #2.7")
2008–2009	Beautiful People	Andy Doonan	TV series (12 episodes)
2009	Morris: A Life with Bells On	Jeremy – The Producer	
2009	Casualty 1909	Saul Landau	TV series (1 episode: "Episode #1.3")
2009–2011	Garrow's Law	Silvester	TV series (12 episodes)
2011	Late Bloomers	James	Film
2012	Metamorphosis	The First Lodger	
2013	Agatha Christie's Poirot	Stephen Norton	TV series (1 episode: "Curtain: Poirot's Last Case")
2013	The Mill	John Doherty	TV series
2013	The Borderlands	Father Mark Amidon	Film
2014–2015	Mr Selfridge	Lord Loxley	TV series
2015	Clean Break	Desmond Rane	TV series
2015	Wifey Redux	Mr. Prendergrast	Film Short
2016	The Fall	Sean Healy	TV series (series 3)
2016–2017	Maigret	Judge Comeliau	TV series (2 episodes)
2018	Black '47	Cronin	Film
2019	Strike Back: Revolution	Connor Ryan	TV series
2019	The Professor and the Madman	Defense Attorney Clarke	Film
2019	Born a King	Humphrey Bowman	Film
2019	The Trial of Christine Keeler	Roger Hollis	BBC TV mini series
2019	Endeavour	Dr. Jasper Nicholson	TV Series
2020	Miss Scarlet and The Duke	Alfred Winters	TV Series (1 episode: "Inheritance")
2021	The Irregulars	Inspector Lestrade	TV series (1 episode: "Both the Needle and the Knife"
2021	Red Election	Zak	TV series (9 episodes)
2022	Ridley	Michael Flannery	TV series (4 episodes)
2022	Tell Me Everything	John	TV series (3 episodes)
2023	Father Brown	Harry Grover	TV series (1 episode: "The Winds of Change")
2024	Einstein and the Bomb	Albert Einstein	TV Movie
2024	Showtrial	Patrick Norris	TV series, 4 episodes
2024	Blackshore	Charlie Reid	TV series, 6 episodes
2025	Bergerac	Pete Benedict	TV series, 6 episodes
2025	Sherlock & Daughter	Chief Inspector Whitlock	TV series, series regular
2025	The Rainmaker	Bernie Manfred	TV series, 2 episodes
