= Sir John Silvester, 1st Baronet =

English lawyer

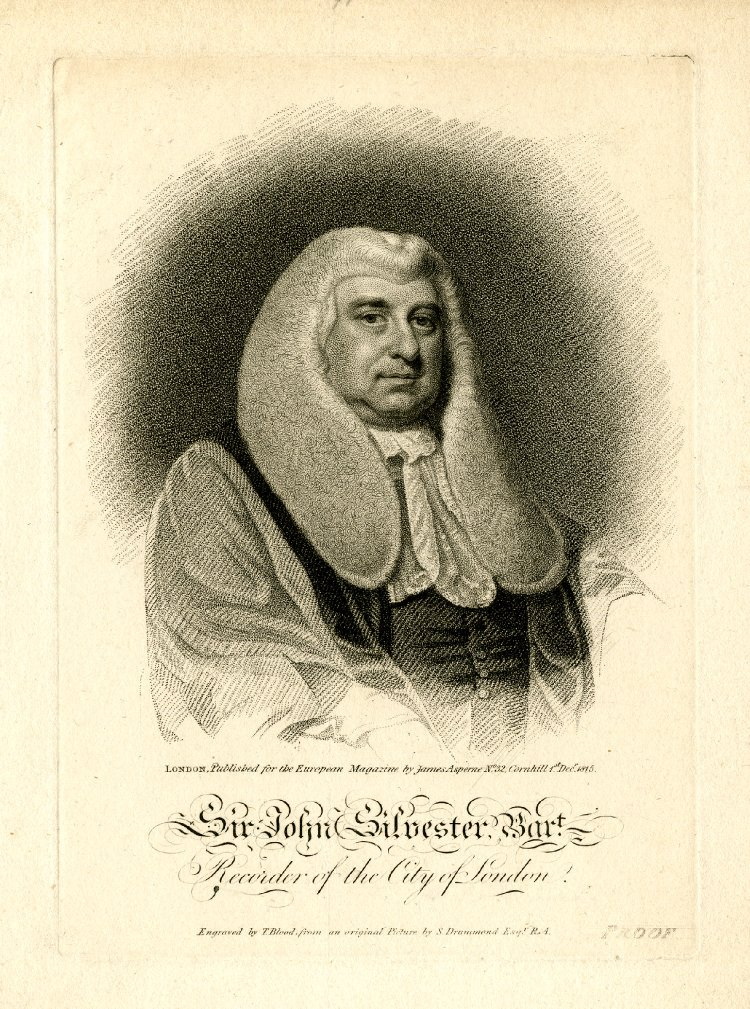
Sir John Silvester c.1815

Sir John Silvester, 1st Baronet, FRS, FSA (7 September 1745 – 30 March 1822) was an English lawyer and Common Serjeant of London from 1790 to 1803, and Recorder of London from 1803 until his death in 1822.

Born in Yardley House in Chingford, Silvester was the son of Sir John Baptist Silvester M.D., FRS (died 1789), of Dutch descent and physician to the army in the Low Countries, under the Duke of Cumberland during the War of the Austrian Succession.

In 1753 aged 8 John Silvester attended Merchant Taylors' School when James Townley was the Headmaster. He took part in the theatrical activities encouraged by Townley and was Head Monitor in 1761. He attended St John's College, Oxford, from 1764 and took his BCL in 1771. On qualifying in the Law he became a barrister at the Old Bailey.

Originally a City Common Pleader, in 1790 he was chosen by the City of London Corporation to take up the post of Common Serjeant of London, and, on the death of Sir John William Rose in 1803 he was appointed Recorder of London, the senior judge at the Old Bailey. As Common Serjeant Silvester was regarded as "uncouth and overly severe".

He was elected a Fellow of the Royal Society in 1780; in 1804 he was elected a Fellow of the Society of Antiquaries and was appointed Steward of Southwark. Silvester was the Commissioner of the Court of Lieutenancy of the City of London. He was created a baronet on 27 December 1814, and was awarded the DCL of the University of Oxford in 1818.

Silvester married twice, but had no children. On his death in 1822 his baronetcy passed to his nephew, Captain Philip Carteret Silvester, RN, CB. His body was taken from his home in Bloomsbury Square to be buried with his family at All Saints Church in Chingford in Essex. His bust was sculpted by Robert William Sievier and was displayed in the Old Bailey but later moved to the Mansion House. He was succeeded as Recorder of London by Newman Knowlys.

== In popular culture ==
- Silvester is mentioned, though does not appear, in Bernard Cornwell's novel Gallows Thief, during his tenure as Recorder of London and senior Circuit Judge, in 1817.
- Silvester was played by Aidan McArdle in the 2009-2011 BBC One television series Garrow's Law

Baronetage of the United Kingdom
New creation	Baronet (of Yardley); 1815–1822	Extinct
New creation	Baronet (of Yardley); 1822	Succeeded by Philip Carteret Silvester
Preceded by McMahon baronets	Silvester baronets of Yardley; 20 May 1815	Succeeded by Antrobus baronets
