= Theophilus Swift =

Irish writer and poet (1746–1815)

Theophilus Swift (1746–1815) was an Irish writer and poet.

== Early life ==
He was born the son of Deane Swift of Dublin, (who was a cousin of Dr. Jonathan Swift) and educated at St Mary Hall, Oxford, graduating B.A. in 1767.

== Career ==
He studied law at the Middle Temple and was called to the bar in 1774. After practising law for a few years, he moved to live in Dublin after inheriting some property in Limerick after the death of his father in 1783. In 1789 he was wounded in a duel in London with Colonel Charles Lennox (afterwards fourth Duke of Richmond and Lennox) following deprecatory remarks he made in a pamphlet. In another pamphlet entitled Animadversions on the Fellows of Trinity College, Dublin he accused some of the fellows at Trinity with having broken the rule which prohibited them from marrying, earning him a twelve months' prison sentence in the Marshalsea prison for libel.

In 1800 he was awarded the Cunningham Medal by the Royal Irish Academy for his essay on The origin and progress of rhyme.

== Death ==
He died in 1815 in Dublin.

== Works ==
- The Gamblers, a poem (anon.), 1777
- The Temple of Folly, in four cantos, London, 1787
- Poetical Address to His Majesty, 1788
- The Female Parliament, a poem, 1789
- The Monster at Large, 1791
- An Essay on Rime, Transactions of Royal Irish Academy, 1801
- The Accomplished Quack: A Treatise on Political Charlatanism, Dublin, 1811
