= Newman Knowlys =

English barrister and judge

Newman Knowlys (1758– 5 January 1836) was an English barrister and judge and the Common Serjeant of London and Recorder of London.

Knowlys was born in London, the fourth son of William Knowlys, a merchant of London. He was educated at Botesdale and at Christ's College, Cambridge but left before taking his degree. Knowlys was admitted to the Middle Temple in 1774 and called to the Bar in 1782. He began to practise at the Central Criminal Court (the Old Bailey) immediately after his call to the Bar and between 1783 and 1803 he was engaged in over 1300 cases there. During the 1790s Knowlys shared the leadership of Old Bailey practice with Jerome William Knapp. Knowlys was made a Bencher of the Middle Temple in 1817, Reader in 1819 and Treasurer in 1826.

He was elected Common Serjeant of London (1803–1811), the second most senior permanent judge of the Central Criminal Court and Recorder of London (1822–33), the senior Circuit Judge at the Central Criminal Court. hearing trials of criminal offences. His term as Common Serjeant was compared by The Morning Chronicle with the severity of that of Judge Jefferys and reported on Knowlys' "unparalleled severity" and "bare-faced system of frightening a jury into a verdict of conviction" during the trial for libel of Richard Carlile.

His term as Recorder made him and the office unpopular through his uncouth and severe actions. The Times had been against his election, disparagingly describing him as "a mere practitioner in the courts" adding that he lacked the personal dignity and legal ability required for the role. Like John Silvester before him Knowlys was against reforming England's severe criminal law. Knowlys was forced to resign in 1833 after issuing a warrant for the execution for Job Cox, a postman in the service of the General Post Office who was charged with stealing the contents of a letter entrusted to him for delivery. Knowlys had sentenced Cox to death and later sent the warrant for his execution even though Cox in the meantime had received a Royal Pardon commuting his sentence to transportation for life. On the error being discovered it was reported that:

"Mr Knowlys, who at this time filled the office of Recorder, was immediately called upon to explain to the Common Hall of the City of London the circumstances which attended the very remarkable error into which he had fallen. When they had heard from him whatever excuse he had to urge, on Monday, 24th of June, they came to the following resolutions:-

Resolved unanimously, that this Common Hall has learned, with feelings of the deepest horror and regret, that the life of Job Cox, a convict under sentence of death in Newgate, had well-nigh been sacrificed by the act of the Recorder of London in sending down a warrant for his execution, notwithstanding his Majesty in Privy Council had, in the gracious exercise of his Royal Prerogative of mercy, been pleased to commute his sentence for an inferior punishment.

Resolved unanimously, that the mildest and most charitable construction which this Common Hall can put upon this conduct of the Recorder is that it was the result of some mental infirmity incident to his advanced age; but contemplating with alarm the dreadful consequences which, though happily averted in the present instance, may possibly ensue from such an infirmity in that important public functionary, this Common Hall feels that an imperative duty to record the solemn expression of its opinion that the recorder ought forthwith to retire from an office the vitally important duties of which he is, from whatever cause, incompetent to discharge."

The Recorder, who was present, was received with deep groans. The resolutions of the Common Hall were followed by a resolution of the court of aldermen announcing the receipt of a communication from the Recorder that from his advanced age, ill-health and debility, consequent upon a late very severe fit of illness, he had felt himself bound, after serving the city for more than forty-seven years – upwards of thirty as Common Serjeant and Recorder – to resign the office of Recorder."

Despite this Knowlys remained Steward of the Borough Court of Southwark until his death. He married late in life in 1807 to Mrs Slope (d. 1837), a widow of Bath. They had no children.

Newman Knowlys died on 5 January 1836 at his house in James Street, Buckingham Gate, London, and was buried in the vault of the Middle Temple.
