= 1930 British Lions tour to New Zealand and Australia =

- Date: 21 May – 1 October
- Coach: James Baxter
- Tour captain: (England) Doug Prentice
- Test series winners: New Zealand (1–3); Australia (1–0)
- Top test point scorer: (England) Carl Aarvold (9)
Summary
P	W	D	L
Total
29	21	0	8
Test match
5	1	0	4
Opponent
P	W	D	L
New Zealand
4	1	0	3
Australia
1	0	0	1

Tour chronology
- ← Argentina 1927 Argentina 1936 →

The 1930 British Lions tour to New Zealand and Australia was the twelfth tour by a British Isles team and the fifth to New Zealand and Australia. This tour is recognised as the first to represent a bona fide British team and the first to be widely dubbed the 'Lions', after the nickname was used by journalists during the 1924 tour of South Africa.

Led by England's Doug Prentice and managed by James Baxter the tour took in 28 matches, seven in Australia and 21 in New Zealand. Of the 28 games, 24 were against club or invitational teams, four were test matches against New Zealand and one was a test match against Australia. The test match results saw the Lions lose to Australia, and win only one of the four New Zealand tests.

As with earlier trips, the selectors had a difficult time putting together the final team that made up the British Isles tour. Roughly a hundred players were approached before the 29 who eventually sailed could be chosen. Of the Lions, the players who stood out on the tour included Roger Spong, Harry Bowcott and Jack Bassett, while Ivor Jones impressed in the pack and set up a memorable try in the first game against New Zealand which gave the Lions their only test win.

== Touring party ==
- Manager: James Baxter

=== Full Backs ===
- Jack Bassett (Penarth and Wales)
- William Gordon MacGregor Bonner (Bradford)

=== Three-Quarters ===
- Carl Aarvold (Cambridge U. and England)
- Jim Reeve (Harlequins and England)
- Jack Morley (Newport and Wales)
- Anthony "Tony" L Novis (Blackheath and England)
- Roy Jennings (Redruth)
- Harry Bowcott (Cambridge U. and Wales)
- Tommy Jones-Davies (London Welsh and Wales)
- Paul Murray (Wanderers and Ireland)

=== Half backs ===
- Roger Spencer Spong (Old Millhillians and England)
- Wilf Sobey (Old Millhillians and England)
- Tom Knowles (Birkenhead Park)
- Howard Poole (Cardiff)

=== Forwards ===
- Doug Prentice (Leicester and England) (captain)
- Henry Rew (Blackheath and England)
- Dai Parker (Swansea and Wales)
- WB Welsh (Hawick and Scotland)
- Brian Henry Black (Oxford U. and England)
- Mike Dunne (Lansdowne and Ireland)
- George Beamish (Leicester and Ireland)
- James "Jimmy" Leo Farrell (Bective Rangers and Ireland)
- John Hodgson (Northern)
- Henry O'Hara O'Neill (Queens and Ireland)
- Ivor Jones (Llanelli and Wales)
- Harry Wilkinson (Halifax and England)
- Sam Martindale (Kendal and England)
- Douglas Kendrew (Leicester and England)
- Harold Jones (Manchester and England)

== Doc on One ==
RTÉ radio has broadcast a documentary about Mike Dunne who corresponded with a Maori princess, Rau Ellison, and sent her his Lions jersey. But their potential romance didn't happen as her family arranged a marriage for her with a neighbouring farmer.

There also was an article in the Irish Independent c 2005 based on Mike Dunne's diaries of the tour.

== Match summary ==
Complete list of matches played by the British Isles in New Zealand and Australia:

Test matches

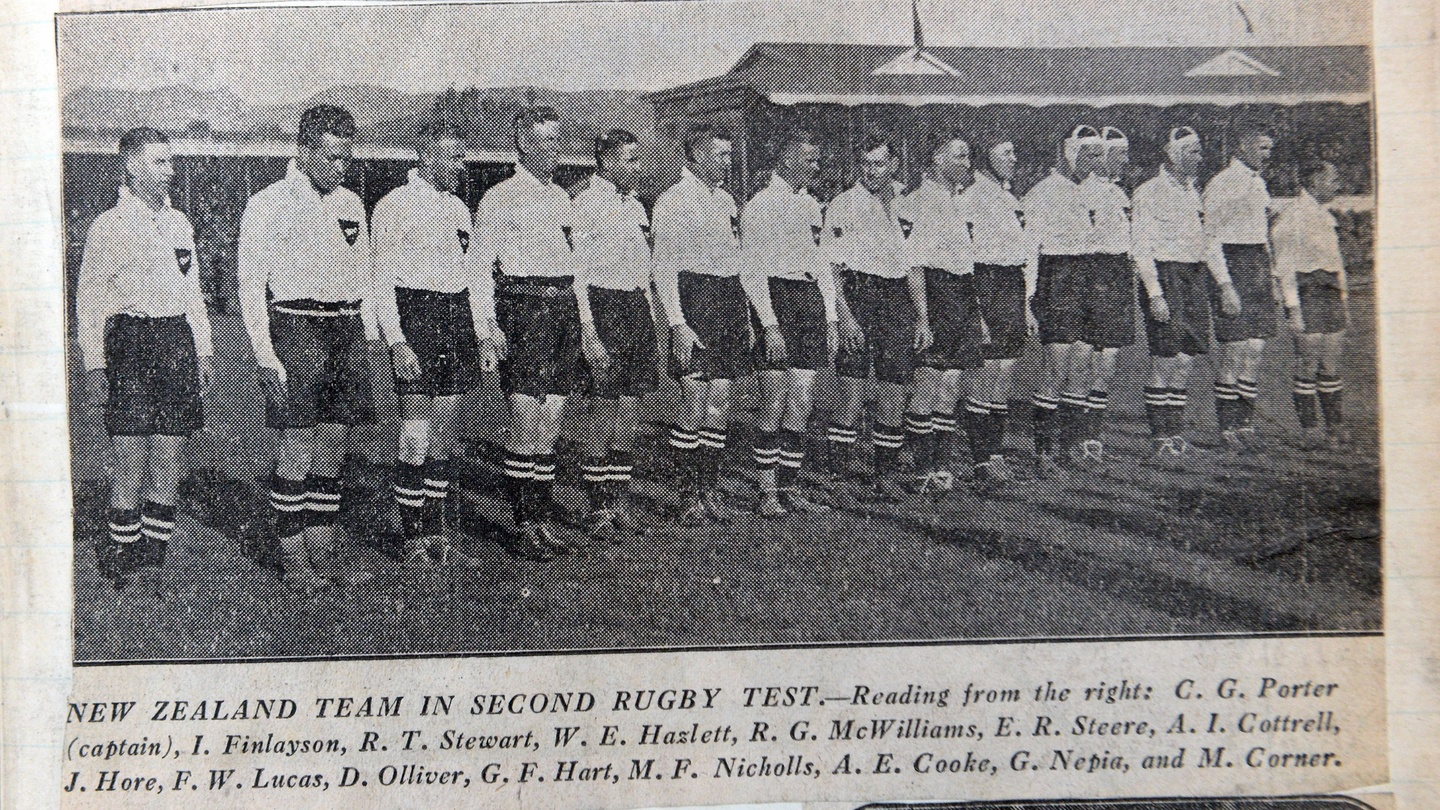
The All Blacks (wearing white shirts) that played the second test v the Lions on 5 July

#	Date	Rival	City	Country	Result	Score
1	21 May	Wanganui	Wanganui	New Zealand	Won	19–3
2	24 May	Taranaki	New Plymouth	New Zealand	Won	23–7
3	28 May	Manawhenua	Palmerston North	New Zealand	Won	34–8
4	31 May	Wairarapa	Masterton	New Zealand	Won	19–6
5	3 June	Wellington	Wellington	New Zealand	Lost	8–12
6	7 June	Canterbury	Christchurch	New Zealand	Lost	8–14
7	11 June	West Coast-Buller	Greymouth	New Zealand	Won	34–11
8	14 June	Otago	Dunedin	New Zealand	Won	33–9
9	21 June	New Zealand	Dunedin	New Zealand	Won	6–3
10	25 June	Southland	Invercargill	New Zealand	Won	9–3
11	28 June	Ashburton / South Canterbury / North Otago	Timaru	New Zealand	Won	16–9
12	5 July	New Zealand	Christchurch	New Zealand	Lost	10–13
13	9 July	New Zealand Māori	Wellington	New Zealand	Won	19–13
14	12 July	Hawke's Bay	Napier	New Zealand	Won	14–3
15	16 July	East Coast / Poverty Bay / Bay of Plenty	Gisborne	New Zealand	Won	25–11
16	19 July	Auckland	Auckland	New Zealand	Lost	6–19
17	26 July	New Zealand	Auckland	New Zealand	Lost	10–15
18	30 July	North Auckland	Whangārei	New Zealand	Won	38–5
19	2 Aug	Waikato / Thames Valley / King Country	Hamilton	New Zealand	Won	40–16
20	9 Aug	New Zealand	Wellington	New Zealand	Lost	8–22
21	12 Aug	Nelson / Marlborough / Golden Bay-Motueka	Blenheim	New Zealand	Won	41–3
22	23 Aug	(New South Wales) NSW Waratahs	Sydney	Australia	Won	29–10
23	30 Aug	Australia	Sydney	Australia	Lost	5–6
24	3 Sep	Queensland Reds	Brisbane	Australia	Won	26–16
25	6 Sep	(Australia) Australian XV	Brisbane	Australia	Won	29–14
26	10 Sep	(New South Wales) NSW Waratahs	Sydney	Australia	Lost	3–28
27	13 Sep	(Victoria (state)) Victoria	Melbourne	Australia	Won	41–36
28	22 Sep	Western Australia	Perth	Australia	Won	71–3
29	1 Oct	(Dominion of Ceylon) Ceylon (Note: Not listed in traditional Lions tests. As a British crown colony, the island was known as Ceylon; it achieved independence from the United Kingdom in 1948.)	Colombo	Sri Lanka	Won	45–0

Notes

Balance
Played in	Pl	W	D	L	Ps	Pc
New Zealand	21	15	0	6	420	205
Australia	7	5	0	2	204	113
Ceylon	1	1	0	0	45	0
Total	29	21	0	8	669	318

== Match details ==
=== New Zealand (First test) ===
21 June 1930

New Zealand	3–6	(United Kingdom) British Isles
Try: G.F. Hart	Report	Try: J.C. Morley, J.S.R. Reeve

Carisbrook, Dunedin
Attendance: 27,000
Referee: S. Hollander (Canterbury, New Zealand)

Team details

New Zealand	British Isles

New Zealand: 15.G.Nepia; 14.G.F.Hart, 13.F.W.Lucas, 12.A.E.Cookie, 11.D.J.Oliver; 10.H. T. Lilburne, 9.J.J.Mill; 8.C.G.Porter (capt), 7.W.A.Batty, 6.W.E.Hazlett; 5.I.Finlayzon, 4.; 3.R.G.McWilliams, 2.W.R.Irvine, 1.A.I.Cottrell
British Isles: 15.J.Bassett; 14.J.C.Morley, 13.H.M.Bowcott, 12.C.D.Aarvold (capt), 11.J.S.R.Reeve; 10.R.S.Spong, 9.P.F.Murray; 8.G. R. Beamish, 7.I.Jones, 6.J.McD.Hodgson; 5.B.H.Black, 4.J.L.Farrell; 3.H.Rew, 2.D.Parker, 1.H.O'Neill

== Bibliography ==
- Godwin, Terry; Rhys, Chris (1987). The Guinness Book of Rugby Facts & Feats. Enfield: Guinness Superlatives Limited. ISBN 0-85112-214-0.
- Griffiths, John (1987). The Phoenix Book of International Rugby Records. London: Phoenix House. ISBN 0-460-07003-7.
- Perera, SS (1981). 100 Years of Rugby Football in Sri Lanka 1879–1978. Sri Lanka Rugby Football Union.
