= 1927 British Lions tour to Argentina =

British Rugby tour of Argentina

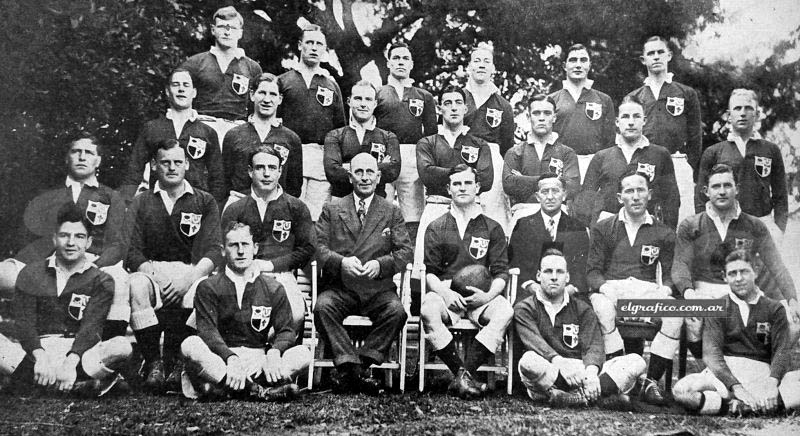
- Date: 24 July – 21 August
- Coach: James Baxter
- Tour captain: (Scotland) David MacMyn
- Test series winners: British Isles (4–0)
- Top test point scorer: (England) Ernie Hammett (40)
Summary
P	W	D	L
Total
9	9	0	0
Test match
4	4	0	0
Opponent
P	W	D	L
Argentina
4	4	0	0

Tour chronology
- ← South Africa 1924 New Zealand and Australia 1930 →

During its second tour to Argentina, the British Isles team, formed by English and Scottish players, played 9 matches in the country, winning all of them with more than 295 points scored and only 9 conceded.

== Background ==
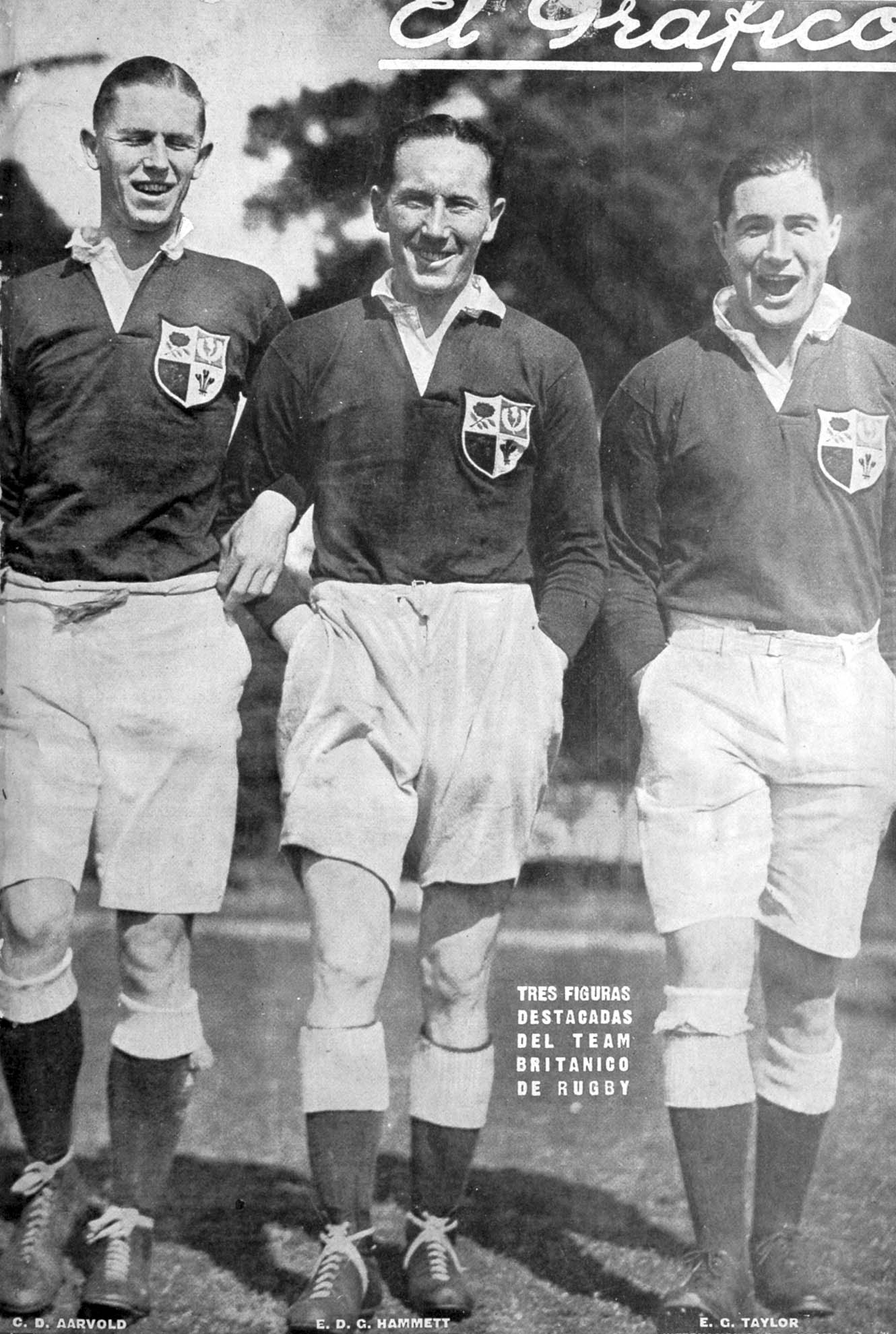
C.D. Aarvold, E. Hammett and E.G. Taylor, covered on Argentine magazine El Gráfico

The River Plate Rugby Union (RPRU, current "Argentine Rugby Union") had formed a commission to study how to bring a British team into the country. To do so they had to have the sum of m$n 25,000 (about £ 3,000 at that time) to pay the travel and subsistence costs of a staff of twenty-five people. With contributions from clubs, newspaper companies, stores such as Gath and Chaves, British railroads and refrigerators and personal contributions, 30,000 pesos were collected. In mid-1926 the RFU received an invitation from the RPRU, requesting for a team of "first class players" to visit Argentina for three or four weeks. The delegation should be of 25 people including a manager and a referee. The RFU responded affirmatively after consulting the International Board.

On July 19, 1927, a team composed of twenty-three players from England, Scotland and Ireland under the direction of James Baxter, none other than the president of the RFU, and a first-class referee, arrived in Buenos Aires and settled in the headquarters of Hurlingham Club for a fixture of nine games.

Fulfilling the request of the RPRU, this British combined was considerably stronger than the one that had been assembled in 1910. No less than fifteen of the twenty-three players were internationals or future internationals. His captain, David MacMyn, was a leading Scottish forward who had been part of the team that won its first Grand Slam in 1925 and shared the title of the Five Nations with Ireland in 1926. During the long sea voyage to Argentina, MacMyn made good use of onboard time for his men to train and make a tactical plan for the tour.

We were all imbued with the desire to play as it should be played, and there was no laziness in our preparation on board the ship. We train hard. Every morning we had practice of scrum, backs, physical training of all kinds and swimming before lunch. At night we had many conversations in front of the blackboard and we made all kinds of plans. And so, the hard training and the free exchange of ideas stimulated us for the exhausting days that we had ahead.

— David MacMyn in his travel diary

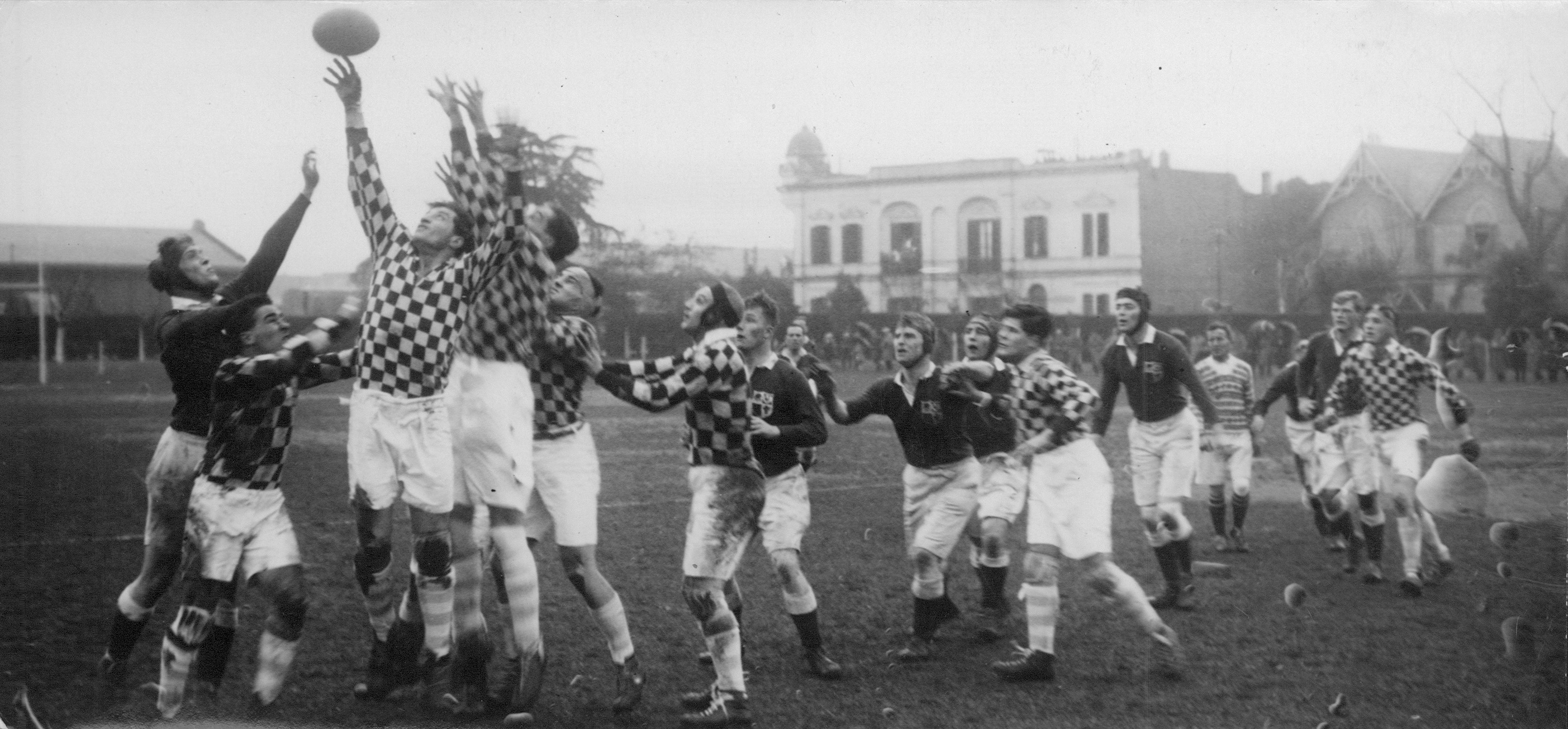
The Lions playing a Universitario–Gimnasia y Esgrima combined in Plaza Jewell, Rosario, on 3 August

In their first games, the Lions played an Anglo-Argentine combined and the Argentine champion San Isidro, which had won eight consecutive domestic championships to date. The Lions won those games with no goals conceded.

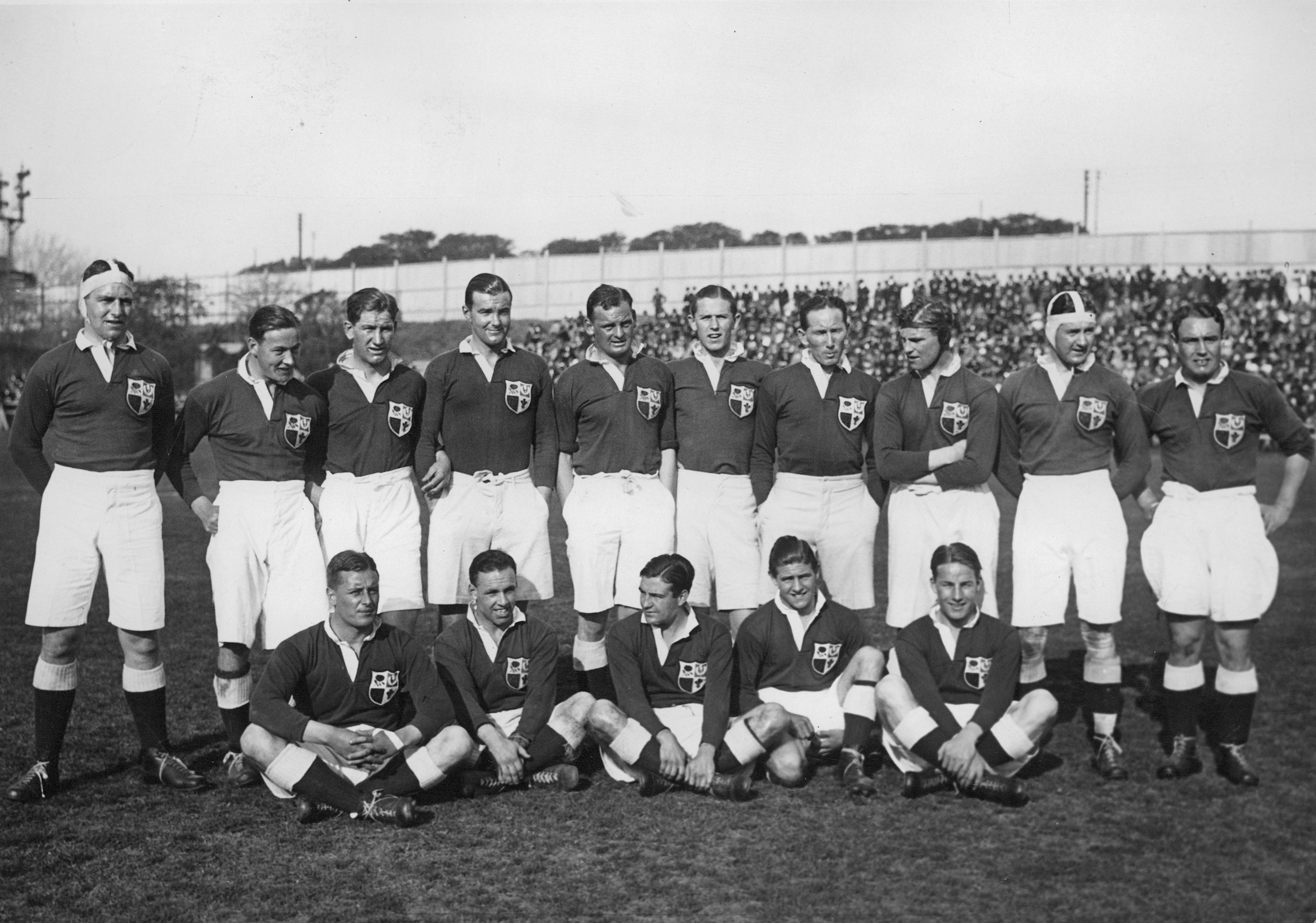
The Lions before playing the last test v. Argentina on 21 August

The following game was the first test v. Argentina, played on 31 July at Gimnasia y Esgrima stadium. It was the first time Argentina wore the horizontal light blue and white jersey (after wearing blue and white jerseys alternatively since its first match in 1910) after a proposal by Gimnasia y Esgrima executive Abelardo Gutiérrez. The match was attended by a record 12,000 spectators. After the match, MacMyn wrote: "The crowd was delighted. They were impressed by the fact that we played in silence, listening only to the captain's voice. Argentines have all the physical qualities required for rugby. They are big, strong and fast. They are tremendously enthusiastic –sometimes, excessively".

After playing Argentina, the Lions moved to the city Rosario in Santa Fe Province to play a combined team composed by players of porteños clubs Universitario and Gimnasia y Esgrima due to the impossibility of joining a competitive team with the small number of players in Rosario. Players of both teams arrived in Rosario after a long journey by train from Retiro to Rosario Norte station, the same day of the match. Held in Plaza Jewell, home venue of Club Atlético del Rosario, the Lions defeated the combined team by 24–0 in a rainy day.

The Lions returned to Buenos Aires to play the second test v. Argentina, winning 46–0 at GEBA, then playing another combined team (composed by players of Belgrano A.C. and Buenos Aires F.C.). The team would play two games more against the national team, the last of them on 21 August.

== Touring team ==
Team kit

Player	Position	Club	Born / National team	1st test	2nd test	3rd test	4th test
Roger Wakefield	Forward	Cambridge Univ.	(uncapped)				
Jack Wallens	Fullback		England	✓		✓	✓
AF Hamilton Smythe	Three-Quarter		(uncapped)			✓	
Robert Kelly	Three-Quarter		Scotland	✓	✓		✓
Edward Taylor	Wing	Oxford Univ.	Scotland		✓	✓	✓
Carl Aarvold	Wing	Cambridge Univ.	England (Note: Capped in 1928.)	✓	✓	✓	✓
Peter Douty	Scrum-half		Scotland		✓	✓	
George McIlwaine	Flanker	Cambridge Univ.	South Africa (Note: Uncapped)	✓	✓	✓	✓
AD Allen	F. Prop	Cambridge Univ.	(uncapped)	✓	✓	✓	✓
Granville Coghlan	Lock	Cambridge Univ.	England		✓		✓
Thomas Gubb	Lock	Oxford Univ.	South Africa			✓	
Donald Troup	Lock/Flanker	Oxford Univ.	(uncapped)	✓		✓	
Eric Coley	Flanker		England (Note: Capped in 1929.)		✓		✓
Theodore Pike	Flanker	Lansdowne	Ireland	✓			
Douglas Law	Hooker		England	✓	✓	✓	✓
Charles Payne	Prop		Ireland	✓	✓	✓	✓
David MacMyn (C)	Number 8	London Scottish	Scotland	✓	✓	✓	✓
Ernie Hammett	Three-Quarter		England	✓	✓	✓	
James Farrell	Lock	Bective Rangers	Ireland	✓	✓	✓	✓
Wilf Sobey	Scrum-half	Old Millhillians	England (Note: Capped in 1930.)	✓	✓		✓
Jules Malfroy	Scrum-half	Cambridge Univ.	New Zealand				
Roger Spong	Fly-half	Old Millhillians	England	✓	✓	✓	✓
Guy Wilson	Wing		England	✓			✓

- Manager: James "Bim" Baxter

== Matches ==
=== Match summary ===
- Full list of matches played by the British Lions in Argentina:
- indicates test matches
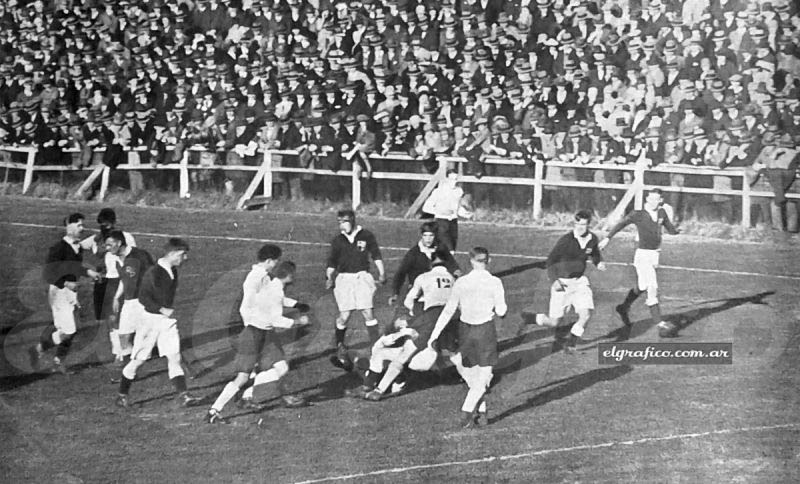
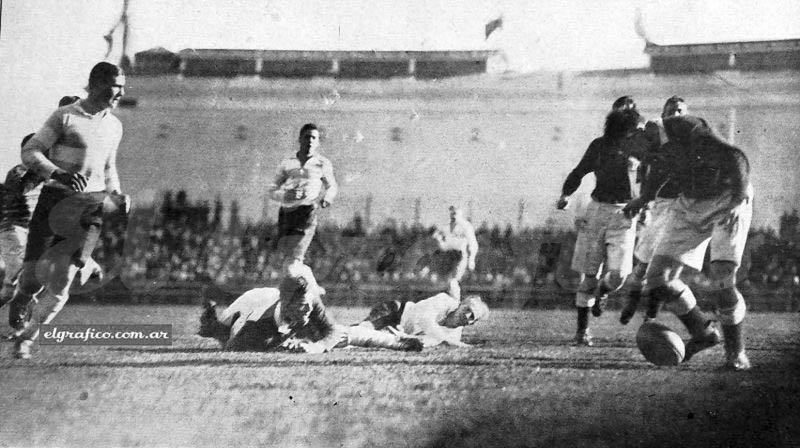
The Lions in action during the third test v. Argentina at Gimnasia y Esgrima

#	Date	Rival	City	Venue	Score
1	24 Jul	Anglo–Argentinos (Note: Selection of Argentine players with English bornplace or origin. At those times, it was usual to play an end of season match of that nature.)	Hurlingham	Hurlingham Club	27–0
2	27 Jul	San Isidro	Buenos Aires	Belgrano A.C.	14–0
3	31 Jul	Argentina	Buenos Aires	Gimnasia y Esgrima	37–0
4	3 Aug	GEBA / CUBA Combined	Rosario	Plaza Jewell	24–0
5	7 Aug	Argentina	Buenos Aires	Gimnasia y Esgrima	46–0
6	10 Aug	Belgrano / Buenos Aires Combined	Buenos Aires	Belgrano A.C.	44–3
7	14 Aug	Argentina	Buenos Aires	Gimnasia y Esgrima	34–3
8	15 Aug	Combinado de Clubes (Note: Combined team of unknown local clubs.)	Buenos Aires	Gimnasia y Esgrima	29–3
9	21 Aug	Argentina	Buenos Aires	Gimnasia y Esgrima	43–0

Notes

Balance
Pl	W	D	L	PS	PC
6	6	0	0	298	9

=== First test ===
31 July 1927

Argentina	0–37	(United Kingdom) British Isles
	Report	Try: Aarvold, Hammett, Kelly, MacMyn, Payne, Spong, Wilson (2); Con: Hammett (3); Pen: Hammett; Drop: Spong

Gimnasia y Esgrima, Buenos Aires
Attendance: 12,000
Referee: Thomas Vile (Wales)

Argentina	British Isles

Argentina			British Isles
César Pollano	FB	15	FB	Jack Wallens
César Vázquez	W	14	W	Guy Wilson
Arturo Rodríguez Jurado (c)	C	13	C	Ernest Hammett
Fabio Lucioni	C	12	C	Robert Kelly
W. Braddon	W	11	W	Carl Aarvold
Alberto Zappa	FH	10	FH	Roger Spong
Reginald Cooper	SH	9	SH	Wilf Sobey
Antonio Pasalagua	N8	8	N8	David MacMyn (c)
Antonio Hobson	F	7	F	Theodore Pike
Miguel McCormick	F	6	F	George McIlwaine
Rodolfo Serra	L	5	L	Donald Troup
Josée Cuesta Silva	L	4	L	Jimmy Farrell
Ray Cameron	P	3	P	Arthur Allen
Jorge Conrard	H	2	H	Douglas Law
Enrique Bustamante	P	1	P	Charles Payne

=== Second test ===
7 August 1927

Argentina	0–46	(United Kingdom) British Isles
		Try: Aarvold (4), Kelly (2), McIlwaine, MacMyn, Payne, Spong; Con: Hammett (6); Drop: Hammett

Gimnasia y Esgrima, Buenos Aires
Referee: Thomas Vile (Wales)

Argentina			British Isles
A. Jacobs	FB	15	FB	Peter Douty
Martín Ayerra	W	14	W	Carl Aarvold
Carlos Reyes	C	13	C	Ernest Hammett
César Vázquez	C	12	C	Robert Kelly
G.E.F. Cooke	W	11	W	Edward Taylor
Marco Hernáandez	FH	10	FH	Roger Spong
Reginald Cooper	SH	9	SH	Wilf Sobey
Julián Sommer	N8	8	N8	David MacMyn (c)
Arturo Rodríguez Jurado (c)	F	7	F	Eric Coley
Roberto Botting	F	6	F	George McIlwaine
Ray Cameron	L	5	L	Granville Coghlan
José Cuesta Silva	L	4	L	Jimmy Farrell
Alfredo Riganti	P	3	P	Arthur Allen
Jorge Conrard	H	2	H	Douglas Law
Enrique Bustamante	P	1	P	Charles Payne

=== Third test ===
14 August 1927

Argentina	3–34	(United Kingdom) British Isles
Goal from mark: Torino		Try: Douty, Hamilton-Smythe (2), McIlwaine, Taylor (3); Con: Hammett (5); Pen: Hammett

Gimnasia y Esgrima, Buenos Aires
Referee: Thomas Vile (Wales)

Argentina			British Isles
C. Derkheim	FB	15	FB	Jack Wallens
Norberto Escary	W	14	W	Carl Aarvold
Carlos Reyes	C	13	C	Ernest Hammett
Marco Hernández	C	12	C	Arthur Hamilton-Smythe
Llewellyn Makin	W	11	W	Edward Taylor
Francisco Torino	FH	10	FH	Roger Spong
Reginald Cooper	SH	9	SH	Peter Douty
Roberto Botting	N8	8	N8	David MacMyn (c)
Arturo Rodríguez Jurado (c)	F	7	F	Donald Troup
Antonio Pasalagua	F	6	F	George McIlwaine
Rodolfo Serra	L	5	L	Tom Gubb
José Cuesta Silva	L	4	L	Jimmy Farrell
Alfredo Riganti	P	3	P	Charles Payne
Vicente Grimoldi	H	2	H	Douglas Law
Enrique Bustamante	P	1	P	Arthur Allen

=== Fourth test ===
21 August 1927

Argentina	0–43	(United Kingdom) British Isles
		Try: Aarvold (3), Coghlan, Kelly (2), McIlwaine, MacMyn, Sobey, Spong, Wilson; Con: Wilson (5)

Gimnasia y Esgrima, Buenos Aires
Referee: Thomas Vile (Wales)

Argentina			British Isles
A. Jacobs	FB	15	FB	Jack Wallens
César Vázquez	W	14	W	Carl Aarvold
Carlos Reyes	C	13	C	Robert Kelly
Marco Hernández	C	12	C	Guy Wilson
Norberto Escary	W	11	W	Edward Taylor
Francisco Torino	FH	10	FH	Roger Spong
Reginald Cooper	SH	9	SH	Wilf Sobey
Roberto Botting	N8	8	N8	David MacMyn (c)
Salvador Muller	F	7	F	Eric Coley
Arturo Rodríguez Jurado (c)	F	6	F	George McIlwaine
José Cuesta Silva	L	5	L	Granville Coghlan
Rodolfo Serra	L	4	L	Jimmy Farrell
Alfredo Riganti	P	3	P	Arthur Allen
Vicente Grimoldi	H	2	H	Douglas Law
Enrique Bustamante	P	1	P	Charles Payne

== Aftermath ==
The British Lions tour on Argentina was a huge success, with a great number of people attending the games in spite of the large defeats to the national team. The RPRU obtained a profit of almost m$n 65,000, which would be invested in mortgage titles to cost future tours with no help from the National State or other government subsidies.

In sporting terms, the tour of the British team of 1927 was of great importance for Argentine rugby, which gave a powerful boost to the expansion of the game in the country. 33 teams were registered to the Union to play at the 1927 domestic championships (four teams more than the previous edition). The boost given by the British team tour also encouraged the creation of new rugby clubs, such as Olivos in 1927 and Los Matreros one year later.

== Bibliography ==
- Mackern, Hugo, Historia del rugby argentino 1917-1930, Buenos Aires, 1986
- Búsico, Jorge, y Cloppet, Alejandro, Ser Puma, 2° edition, Buenos Aires: Zona de Tackle, 2012
- Jones, Stephen, Behind the Lions, Edinburgh: Birlinn Ltd., 2013
- Thomas, Clem & Thomas, Greg, The British & Irish Lions Official History, Edinburgh: Mainstream, 1966, 2013
