= Harold Locke =

England international rugby union player

- Full name: Harold Meadows Locke
- Born: 20 January 1898 Birkenhead, England
- Died: 23 March 1960 (aged 62) Birmingham, England
- School: Birkenhead School

Rugby union career
- Position: Centre
International career
Years	Team	Apps	(Points)
1923–27	England	12	(3)

Harold Meadows Locke (20 January 1898 – 23 March 1960) was an English international rugby union player.

Born in Birkenhead, Locke was a hard running centre, who picked up rugby during his time at Birkenhead School.

Locke formed a successful three-quarter partnership with Wilfrid Lowry in matches for Birkenhead Park and Cheshire. He was a member of England's 1923 and 1924 grand slam-winning Five Nations campaigns. His Cheshire career included a memorable try against the touring "Invincible" All Blacks in the 1924–25 season. He won the last of his 12 England caps in 1927, after which he relocated to the West Country and played for Bristol.

== See also ==
- List of England national rugby union players
