= Sam Beazley =

English actor (1916–2017)

- Born: 29 March 1916; Kensington, London, England
- Died: 12 June 2017 (aged 101)
- Occupation: Actor

Sam Beazley (29 March 1916 – 12 June 2017) was a British actor.

== Early life ==
Sam Beazley was born in Kensington, London, the eldest of three children born to Captain (Robert) Gordon Beazley (died 1953), and his wife, Ellen (Williams) Beazley (1891–1976). Sam's parents, who were cousins, came from prominent families. Gordon Beazley was the son of Robert Clover Beazley (1850–1925) and Harriet Gertrude (née Williams); the Beazley family, from the Wirral, was in the cotton-broking business. Ellen was the daughter of Sir Osmond Williams, Liberal MP for Merioneth between 1900 and 1910, and Frances Evelyn Greaves. Relatives included Gordon's brother Hugh Loveday Beazley, a County Court Judge (1934–1937), a Judge of the Mayor's and City of London Court (1937–1942) and the Common Serjeant of London (1942–1953) and Hugh's son, Wing Commander Hugh John Beazley, DFC (1916–2011).

Gordon Beazley had returned from the First World War shell-shocked and often ill. His marriage soon broke down and the pair separated in the 1920s after the cotton crash caused the family fortune to slump. Ellen had to turn to her father for financial help.

== Career ==
Beazley was encouraged to become a professional actor in the 1930s as a teenager by his mother. After he had appeared in a London run of Where the Rainbow Ends, his mother secured him an introduction to John Gielgud. An invitation to join Gielgud's theatre company followed, and Beazley appeared in Gielgud's productions of Hamlet as the "Player Queen" (1934) and Romeo and Juliet as "Paris" (1935). After Tatler's theatre critic negatively reviewed his performance in Romeo and Juliet, Beazley decided he "simply hadn’t got the knack" for acting, and gave it up.

After serving in World War II, Beazley co-owned an antique shop for several decades. He returned to acting full time when he retired at 73, and subsequently appeared in a variety of stage and film productions; as well he became a painter in his nineties.

== Longevity and death ==
A 2010 article by Nicholas de Jongh in The Independent described "the amazing" Beazley as "the last theatre survivor of his generation".

Beazley died on 12 June 2017, aged 101.

== Filmography ==
Year	Title	Role	Notes
1988	Madame Sousatzka	Festival Guest	
1990	Portrait of a Marriage	Lord Carnock	1 episode
1995	Pride and Prejudice	Vicar	1 episode
2000	Midsomer Murders	Cyril Toft	Episode: "Blue Herrings"
2000	Passionnément	Matthew	
2003	Johnny English	Elderly Man at the hospital	
2003	Doctors	Tom	Episode: "House of Cards"
2004	Bridget Jones: The Edge of Reason	Very Old Man	
2006	Torchwood	Alan Ellis	Episode: "Out of Time"
2007	Kingdom	Mr. Bewley	1 episode
2007	Foyle's War	George Woodbridge	Episode: "Casualties of War"
2007	Harry Potter and the Order of the Phoenix	Everard	
