= Hugh Beazley =

Hugh Beazley may refer to:

- Hugh Loveday Beazley (1880–1964), English judge
- Hugh John Beazley (1916–2011), his son, Royal Air Force fighter pilot
