= Paul Murray (rugby union) =

Irish rugby union player

- Full name: Paul Finbarr Murray
- Born: 29 June 1905 Sandycove, Dublin, Ireland
- Died: 1 June 1981 (aged 75) Ballsbridge, Dublin, Ireland
- School: Blackrock College
- Occupation: Medical practitioner

Rugby union career
- Position: Half-back / Centre
International career
Years	Team	Apps	(Points)
1927–33	Ireland	19	(33)
1930	British Lions	4	(0)

Paul Finbarr Murray (29 June 1905 — 1 June 1981) was an Irish rugby union international.

One of nine siblings, Murray was born in Dublin and attended Blackrock College.

Murray, who captained Dublin club Wanderers, played provincial rugby for Leinster and was capped 19 times for Ireland, debuting in 1927. He was a versatile back, making his Ireland appearances as a centre, out-half and scrum-half. In 1930, Murray made the British Lions squad for the tour of New Zealand and Australia, featuring in four of the five Tests. He was picked as a three-quarter, but ended up as the team's scrum-half, after Wilf Sobey got injured.

A medical practitioner, Murray became an Ireland selector after retiring from rugby in 1934. He remained active in sport as a golfer and won the 1940 South of Ireland Championship. In 1965 and 1966, Murray served as IRFU president. He had a son John who was capped for Ireland in 1963 and his daughter Oonagh played hockey for Ireland.

== See also ==
- List of Ireland national rugby union players
