= Philip Spray =

English cricketer

Personal information
- Full name: Philip Henry Spray
- Born: 28 September 1945 (age 81); Bedford, England
- Batting: Right-handed

Domestic team information
- Years: Team
- 1967–1968: Oxford University

Career statistics
Competition	First-class
Matches	9
Runs scored	135
Batting average	12.27
100s/50s	0/1
Top score	54
Balls bowled	–
Wickets	–
Bowling average	–
5 wickets in innings	–
10 wickets in match	–
Best bowling	–
Catches/stumpings	4/–
- Source: Cricinfo, 28 August 2017

Philip Henry Spray (born 28 September 1945) is a former cricketer who played first-class cricket for Oxford University in 1967 and 1968. He became a schoolteacher.

== Life and career ==
=== Cricket ===
Born in Bedford, Spray attended Bedford School, where he captained the First XI and batted successfully at Lord's for The Rest and Combined Schools in 1964. He played five matches for Bedfordshire in the Minor Counties Cricket Championship between 1964 and 1973.

He went up to St Edmund Hall, Oxford, and played nine matches for Oxford University in 1967 and 1968 without establishing a place in the side. Oxford won only one match in those two seasons, against Somerset in 1967 when, in his second match for the university, Spray scored 54, the second-highest score of the match for either side.

=== Teaching ===
Spray became a geography teacher and senior master at Caldicott School in Buckinghamshire. He also coached the cricket team. One of the pupils he coached was Andrew Strauss, who went on to captain the England Test team.
