= Douglas Law =

British Lions & England international rugby union player

- Full name: Douglas Edward Law
- Born: 12 October 1902 Huddersfield, England
- Died: 13 July 1986 (aged 83) Hayling Island, England
- School: Birkenhead School

Rugby union career
- Position: Hooker
International career
Years	Team	Apps	(Points)
1927	British Lions		
1927	England	1	(0)

Douglas Edward Law (12 October 1902 – 13 July 1986) was an English international rugby union player.

== Biography ==
Law was born in Huddersfield and educated at Birkenhead School.

Primarily a hooker, Law played his rugby with Birkenhead Park, which he captained for multiple seasons. He was a durable player, not missing a single club match or Cheshire fixture in a period between 1923 and 1927. His solitary England cap came against Ireland at Twickenham in the 1927 Five Nations. Later that year, Law toured Argentina with the British Lions and played all four matches against the Pumas, forming a front-row beside Arthur Allen and Charles Payne.

== See also ==
- List of British & Irish Lions players
- List of England national rugby union players
