= Anthony Hawke =

Anthony Hawke may refer to:

- Anthony Hawke (judge, born 1869) (1869–1941), Unionist politician, member of parliament and High Court judge
- Anthony Hawke (judge, born 1895) (1895–1964), his son, British judge

== See also ==
- Tony Hawk (born 1968), American skateboarder
