= Micheal Farrell =

Irish painter (1940–2000)

- Born: 3 July 1940; Cookstown House, County Meath, Ireland
- Died: 7 June 2000 (aged 59); Cardet, Occitania, France
- Education: Saint Martin's School of Art
- Known for: acrylic painting
- Notable work: Madonna Irsland, or The Very First Real Irish Political Picture; Rencontres; A Shorter History of Ireland
- Movement: minimalism, formalism, pop art, Modernism
- Spouses: Patricia Lamplew; Meg Bosanquet Early
- Children: 4
- Parent(s): Jimmy Farrell; Nora Folwell
- Elected: Aosdána (1987)

Micheal Farrell (MEE-hawl, also spelt Micheál; 3 July 1940 – 7 June 2000) was an Irish painter and printmaker. He was a member of Aosdána, an elite Irish association of artists.

== Early life ==
Farrell was born in Cookstown House, County Meath in 1940; his father was Jimmy Farrell, a noted rugby union player. He attended the Christian Brothers school in Kells, where he was beaten for having dyslexia; he was then sent to Ampleforth College, Yorkshire.

== Career ==
Farrell studied at Saint Martin's School of Art in London in 1957–61. He represented Ireland at the Biennale de Paris in 1967.

Farrell worked in acrylics, drawing inspiration from medieval illuminated manuscripts. He won the main award at the 1969 Irish Exhibition of Living Art and made a speech criticising British conduct in Northern Ireland. He emigrated to France in 1971 with his family, staying for a time at the famous artists' residence La Ruche.

According to the Crawford Art Gallery, "His self-portraits echo his critical analysis of Ireland, suggesting a crisis of masculinity, something that becomes a significant preoccupation that treads a fine line between self-pity and ruthless self-examination".

In 1987 he was elected to Aosdána.

He received a retrospective at the Crawford Gallery in 2013–14. His work is held at the Irish Museum of Modern Art, Hugh Lane Gallery, Ulster Museum, Manchester Art Gallery, Pompidou Centre, National Gallery of Ireland and the Musée d'Art Moderne de Paris.

== Personal life ==
Aged 24, he fathered an illegitimate child, with his girlfriend Sarah Shearman; he then married Patricia "Pat" Lamplew, with whom he had three sons. In 1992 he divorced her and married Meg Bosanquet Early. He died in Cardet, France in 2000.
