= Maurice Bonaventura =

English rugby union player

- Full name: Maurice Sydney Bonaventura
- Born: 28 April 1902 Rochford, Essex, England
- Died: 14 July 1992 (aged 90) Lewes, East Sussex, England
- School: Cranleigh School

Rugby union career
- Position: Forward
International career
Years	Team	Apps	(Points)
1931	England	1	(0)

Maurice Sydney Bonaventura (28 April 1902 – 14 July 1992) was an English international rugby union player.

Bonaventura was born in Rochford, Essex, and educated at Cranleigh School.

A forward, Bonaventura played for Blackheath and was capped for England in a 1931 Five Nations match against Wales at Twickenham, forming a front row with Henry Rew and his captain Sam Tucker.

Bonaventura was involved in the oil industry in Singapore.

== See also ==
- List of England national rugby union players
