= John Synge =

John Synge may refer to:

- John Lighton Synge (1897–1995), Irish mathematician and physicist
- John Millington Synge (1871–1909), Irish dramatist, poet, prose writer, and collector of folklore
- John Synge (rugby union), Irish international rugby union player
