= John Paterson (rugby union) =

Scotland international rugby union player

- Full name: John Rimmer Paterson
- Born: 19 December 1900 Rock Ferry, Birkenhead, England
- Died: 25 September 1970 (aged 69) Liverpool, England

Rugby union career
- Position: Wing-forward
International career
Years	Team	Apps	(Points)
1925–29	Scotland	21	(6)

John Rimmer Paterson (19 December 1900 — 25 September 1970) was a Scottish international rugby union player.

Paterson was born in Birkenhead, where his family had a long-standing real estate firm established by his great-grandfather. He also played his club rugby in the town for Birkenhead Park, but had attended school in Scotland.

In 1925, Paterson got his start in international rugby as a member of Scotland's grand slam-winning Five Nations campaign, which was the first time they achieved the feat.

Paterson amassed 21 caps for Scotland as a wing-forward, before retiring in 1929.

A chartered surveyor, Paterson joined the family firm Paterson and Thomas in 1921 and became a senior partner.

== See also ==
- List of Scotland national rugby union players
