= Wilf Sobey =

British Lions & England international rugby union player

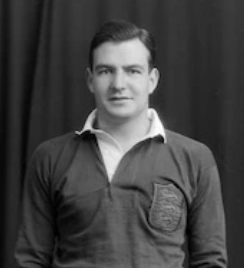
- Full name: Wilfred Henry Sobey
- Born: 1 April 1905 Pachuca, Mexico
- Died: 27 February 1988 (aged 82) Wandsworth, England
- School: Mill Hill School
- University: University of Cambridge
- Occupation: Schoolmaster

Rugby union career
- Position: Scrum-half
International career
Years	Team	Apps	(Points)
1927–30	British Lions		
1930–32	England	5	(0)

Wilfred Henry Sobey (1 April 1905 – 27 February 1988) was an English international rugby union player.

== Biography ==
Sobey was born in Pachuca, Mexico, where his father was a miner.

While attending Mill Hill School, Sobey was team captain in five different sports and as a rugby scrum-half formed a halfback partnership with Roger Spong, which continued when they both played for England.

Sobey, a Cambridge blue and Old Millhillians player, toured Argentina in 1927 with the British Lions. He made his England debut in the 1930 Five Nations Championship, appearing in three of the matches, then was vice captain of the 1930 British Lions on their tour of Australasia, but didn't get to play in any of the international fixtures due to a knee injury. After not featuring in 1931, Sobey returned to the England side in 1932 for their match against the 1931–32 Springboks at Twickenham, before gaining his fifth and final cap two-weeks later in Swansea.

A school teacher, Sobey was Headmaster of Kingsfield School in Oxhey from 1940 to 1970.

== See also ==
- List of British & Irish Lions players
- List of England national rugby union players
