= Jules Malfroy =

- Born: Jules Omer John Malfroy; 4 December 1901 Hokitika, New Zealand
- Died: 3 August 1973 (aged 71) Bridge House Great Shelford Cambridge England
- Height: 5 ft 7 in (170 cm)
- School: Waitaki Boys' High School
- University: Canterbury College; Victoria University College; Trinity Hall, Cambridge

Rugby union career
- Position: Scrum-half
Amateur team(s)
Years	Team	Apps	(Points)
1926	Cambridge University RUFC		
International career
Years	Team	Apps	(Points)
1927	(United Kingdom) British Isles	0	

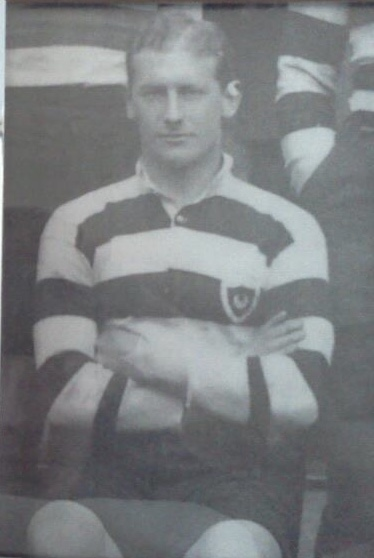
Trinity Hall Cambridge Rugby Team 1925

Jules Omer John Malfroy (4 December 1901 – 3 August 1973) was a prominent New Zealand lawyer, legal advisor to the British government during the Second World War, and an early twentieth century rugby union international. He is known as one of the "lost lions" due to his participation on the 1927 British Lions tour to Argentina, which, although retrospectively recognised as a Lions tour, did not confer Test status on any of the four encounters with the Argentina national rugby union team.

== Early life ==
Jules Malfroy was born in 1901, the eldest son of Camille M. Malfroy, of the State Forest Department, Wellington. The Malfroy family in New Zealand was descended from Jean Baptiste Malfroy originally from Macornay, Lons-le-Saunier, Jura, France, a miller, and his wife, Josephine Pricarde. Jean Baptiste along with two of his sons, Jean Michel Camille Malfroy, usually known as Camille, and Jules Cézar Malfroy, (the eldest of the three brothers), joined the rush to the Victorian goldfields in the 1850s and arrived in New Zealand in the early 1860s.

Jules Malfroy was born at Hokitika, where he received his primary education. He spent one year at the local Boys' High School before moving to the Waitaki Boys' High School. At Waitaki he became a prefect and matriculated in 1919. He then entered a legal office in Christchurch in 1920 and studied law at Canterbury College. In 1922, he wants to Wellington where he continued his studies at Victoria University College and secured his LL.B. degree whilst earning his living in legal offices. He then went on to study for honours in law and LL.M., whilst practising as both a barrister and solicitor in the employ of the legal firm of Bell, Gully, Mackenzie, and O'Leary. Malfroy, was nominated in 1924 as the Wellington candidate for 1924 for the Rhodes Scholarship. He was then awarded the Jacob Joseph Scholarship for law research in 1924 and again was nominated for the Rhodes scholarship in 1925. However, from Victoria University College he gained a law travelling scholarship that took him to Trinity Hall, Cambridge.

== Sport ==
Malfroy was both a rugby footballer and athlete, having represented Wellington province for three years in rugby union. In 1923, he represented Wellington at the New Zealand amateur athletic championship meeting and from 1920 to 1924 represented his college in athletics at the Easter tournament. In 1923 was a member of the New Zealand University football team which went to Sydney. He again represented New Zealand University in 1924. He was described as "the nuggetty little chap, with an abnormally long stride" whilst playing for the New Zealand University and Wellington sides. And as a hurdler he gained distinction, coming second to H. E. Wilson at the New Zealand championships over the 440-yard race.

At Cambridge, he gained his rugby blue, and it was from here that he was selected for the 1927 tour to Argentina. On this tour, he was one of a number of uncapped players, but only one of two players not selected to play in any of the tests. Despite being selected for the Great Britain side, he never went on to play for his national side.

== Career ==
He entered Trinity Hall, Cambridge, and from there was awarded a Harkness Fellowship, under which he continued to specialise in international law at Columbia University, New York, and Berkeley College, California.

During the Second World War he attained the rank of wing commander in the administrative branch of the Royal Air Force. He was also appointed a legal expert to the British government.

== Personal and later life ==
Jules Malfroy's younger brother was Cam Malfroy, a well-known tennis player during the 1930s and 1940s and a flying ace of the Second World War. Jules Malfroy married Charlotte Georgiana Rose Mary Somerset, daughter of Charles Edward Henry Somerset and Edith Morten Weatherly, on 25 September 1933.
