= Charlotte Marsh =

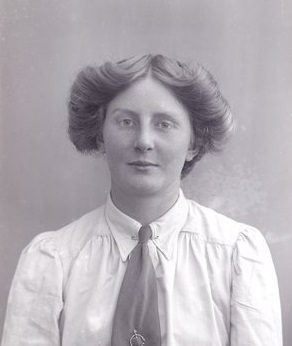
- Charlotte Marsh in 1911
- Born: Charlotte Augusta Leopoldine Marsh; 3 March 1887; Newcastle upon Tyne, England
- Died: 21 April 1961 (aged 74); London, England
- Occupations: suffrage organiser and activist
- Known for: Organising suffrage demonstrations

Charlotte Augusta Leopoldine Marsh (3 March 1887 – 21 April 1961), known as Charlie Marsh, was a militant British suffragette.

She was a paid organiser of the Women's Social and Political Union and is one of the first women to be force fed during one of several terms of imprisonment for militant protest. She was chauffeur and mechanic to David Lloyd George during the First World War.

== Early life ==
Marsh was born on 3 March 1887 in Alnmouth, near Newcastle, to Ellen (née Hall) (1863–1942) and Arthur Hardwick Marsh, a noted watercolourist residing at Prudhoe Tower. She had two older half sisters Margaret Hannah Phillis Marsh (1877–1931) and Phillis Clara Sylvia Marsh (1877–1965) from her father's first marriage to Juliana Phillis Glover (1839–1878) and four full sisters Nellie Wellesley Marsh (1885–1964); Dorothy Hale Marsh (1890–?); Margaret Marsh (1892–) and Lois Marsh (1895–1963). Charlotte Marsh was educated locally at St Margaret's School and then at Roseneath in Wrexham before completing her education in Bordeaux.

== Suffragette activity ==
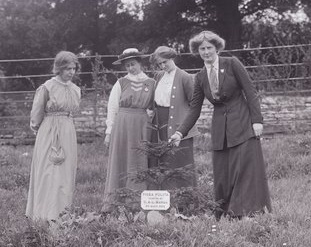
Marsh is shown here planting a tree at Eagle House witnessed by Annie Kenney, Mary Blathwayt and Laura Ainsworth

In 1907 Marsh joined the Women's Social and Political Union, but did not become active. It is thought that her training as a sanitary inspector opened her eyes to the plight of women. Marsh became a full-time organiser for the WSPU. She helped Mary Philips in pavement chalking in Lambeth, whom Philips noted 'gamely stood the jeering and rough handling' the women got in the process. She was also seen on parade which was considered less likely to attract violence, with Dora Spong with Dorothy Hartopp Radcliffe, Hilda Dallas handing out Votes for Women, and publicising with a placard the upcoming Women's Parliament on 30 June 1908. Then on 30 June 1908 she was arrested with Elsie Howey and imprisoned in Holloway for a month on charges of obstructing the police.

On 17 September 1909 Marsh, Mary Leigh and Patricia Woodlock climbed onto the roof of Bingley Hall in Birmingham to protest at being excluded from a political meeting where the British Prime Minister Asquith was giving a speech. They threw roof tiles which they levered up with an axe at the Asquith's car and at the police. She was sent to trial and then on to Winson Green Prison. In protest about not being treated as a political prisoner they went on hunger strike. Marsh, Leigh and Woodlock became three of the first suffragette hunger strikers to be forcibly fed. Marsh was reported to have been fed by tube 139 times during this imprisonment and released two days later that was the norm for when her father's fatal illness.

Marsh was invited as a leading suffragette to Eagle House in Batheaston in April 1911. This was the home of Mary Blathwayt and her parents and they invited leading suffragettes to plant trees. Colonel Blathwayt would take a photo and a plaque was made to record the event. Marsh planted Picea polita. Mary's mother, Emily Blathwayt, recorded that Marsh was not eating meat but seemed to have recovered from her imprisonment. Marsh refused to complete the 1911 census, and was recorded as spending the census night at St James Hall, Landport returning home to 4 Pelham Road, Portsmouth the next day and "absolutely refuses to full up paper".

Procession of Suffragettes on The Strand on 30 June 1908. The Suffragettes are (left to right) Dorothy Hartopp Radcliffe, Dora Spong who appears to be holding a pile of Votes for Women newspapers, Hilda Dallas and Charlotte Marsh carrying the placard

Marsh had been given a Hunger Strike Medal 'for Valour' by WSPU.

In 1912 working from home in Dorking, she campaigned in support of the Pethick-Lawrence's, whose mansion was being sold, to meet fines for suffragette activism, she worked with Helen Gordon Liddle.

== First World War ==
During World War I she worked as a mechanic and chauffeur for David Lloyd George, whilst continuing her activism. Lloyd George was aware of her background but he wanted to make a political bridge to those wanting suffrage. Moreover, he wanted to employ a woman as he was campaigning for women to join the workforce to replace then men who were in the armed forces. Lloyd George also drove his car but Marsh served as its mechanic. Marsh also worked for the Land Army.

By 1916, Marsh was frustrated with the WSPU's refusal to campaign on suffrage issues during the war. She founded the breakaway Independent Women's Social and Political Union to continue the campaign, publishing Independent Suffragette.

== Post war ==
After the war she worked for the Women's International League for Peace and Freedom peace movement and then as a social worker in San Francisco.

Marsh returned to London where she returned to her expertise in public health working for London County Council. She was involved with Edith How-Martyn in setting up the collection of the Suffragette Fellowship documenting the movement. Marsh was a member of the Six Point Group's executive council with Theresa Garnett.

In 1952, she gave a speech at the inaugural meeting of the National Assembly of Women and presented a declaration of women's solidarity for equality and peace.

== Death and legacy ==
Marsh died on 21 April 1961, aged 74, at 31 Copse Hill, London. A blue plaque was created in 2018 -- to commemorate Marsh and the local suffragettes on the centenary of women over 30 getting the vote a hundred years earlier -- at 43 Howard Road, Dorking.
