= John Murray (rugby union) =

Irish rugby union player

- Full name: John Brendan Murray
- Born: 3 April 1942 (age 84) Dublin, Ireland
- University: University College Dublin
- Notable relative: Paul Murray (father)

Rugby union career
- Position: Out-half
International career
Years	Team	Apps	(Points)
1963	Ireland	1	(0)

John Brendan Murray (born 3 April 1942) is an Irish former international rugby union player.

Born in Dublin, Murray is the son of Ireland rugby player and administrator Paul Murray. He showed promise as a tennis player and was the number one ranked junior in Ireland, but wasn't able to fully commit to the sport.

Murray's solitary Ireland rugby cap came while a medical student at University College Dublin, replacing Mick English at out-half for a 1963 Five Nations Championship match against France in Lansdowne Road.

== See also ==
- List of Ireland national rugby union players
