= Guy Wilson (rugby union) =

British Lions & England international rugby union player

- Full name: Guy Summerfield Wilson
- Born: 30 August 1907 Leigh, England
- Died: 8 July 1979 (aged 71) Lancaster, England

Rugby union career
- Position: Three-quarter
International career
Years	Team	Apps	(Points)
1927	British Lions		
1929	England	2	(4)

Guy Summerfield Wilson (30 August 1907 – 8 July 1979) was an English international rugby union player.

Wilson was born in Leigh and started his rugby career with Tyldesley, which he joined aged 17.

A versatile back, Wilson toured Argentina with the British Lions in 1927, playing twice against the Pumas. He scored two tries from the wing in the first match of the series, then as a centre in the fourth and final international kicked five conversions for the Lions. After impressing England selector James Baxter while representing Lancashire, Wilson was invited to the England trials for the 1929 Five Nations and won a place for their tournament opener against Wales at Twickenham. He retained his place for their next match against Ireland.

Wilson was an insurance broker by profession.

== See also ==
- List of British & Irish Lions players
- List of England national rugby union players
