= Jimmy Farrell =

Irish rugby union player

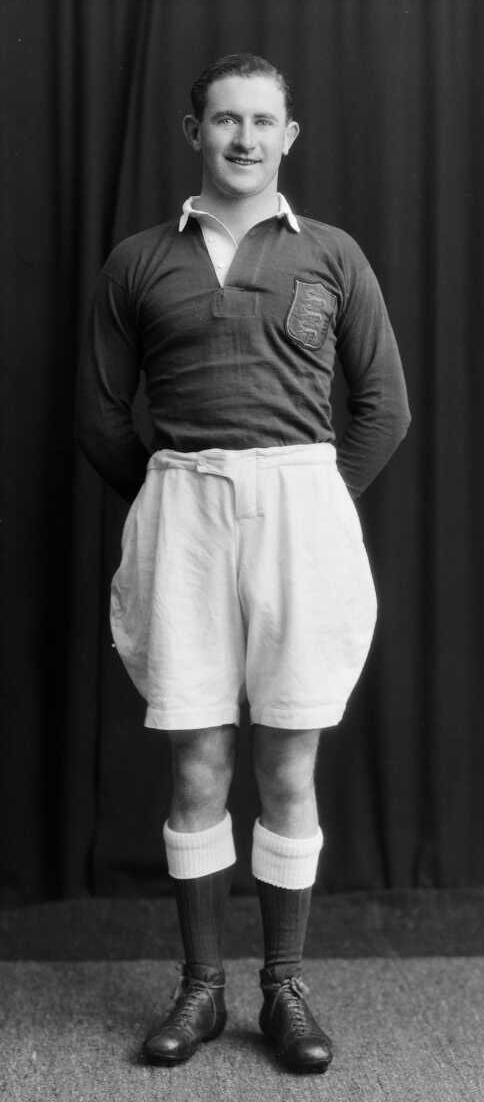
- Farrell in New Zealand in 1930
- Born: 7 August 1903 Ireland
- Died: 24 October 1979 (aged 76) Cirencester, England

Rugby union career
Amateur team(s)
| Years | Team | Apps | (Points) |
| – | Castleknock SCT | | |
Senior career
| Years | Team | Apps | (Points) |
| – | Bective Rangers | | |
International career
| Years | Team | Apps | (Points) |
| – | Ireland | | |
| 1927, 1930 | British Lions | | |

James Leo Farrell (7 August 1903 – 24 October 1979) was an Irish rugby player. He was educated at Castleknock College and captained the Castleknock SCT to Leinster Schools Senior Cup success in 1920. He played for Bective Rangers and Ireland (1926–32) and was a member of the British Lions squad on the 1927 British Lions tour to Argentina and the 1930 British Lions tour to New Zealand and Australia

He had four children with his wife Nora (née Folwell), including the artist Micheal Farrell (1940–2000).
