= Donald Troup =

- Full name: Donald Scott Troup
- University: University of Oxford

Rugby union career
- Position: Forward
International career
| Years | Team | Apps | (Points) |
| 1927 | British Lions | | |

Donald Scott Troup (1907 – 1973) was a Scottish international rugby union player.

Troup was the son of forestry expert Robert Scott Troup. He attended Uppingham School and Dragon School, followed by the University of Oxford, where he was a rugby blue.

A forward, Troup attended trials for Scotland and represented the British Lions on their 1927 tour to Argentina, playing in four fixtures including two of the matches against the Pumas.

Troup was a colonial administrator in Tanganyika.

== See also ==
- List of British & Irish Lions players
