= Caldicott School =

Preparatory school in Buckinghamshire, England

Coordinates: 51°33′04″N 0°37′15″W

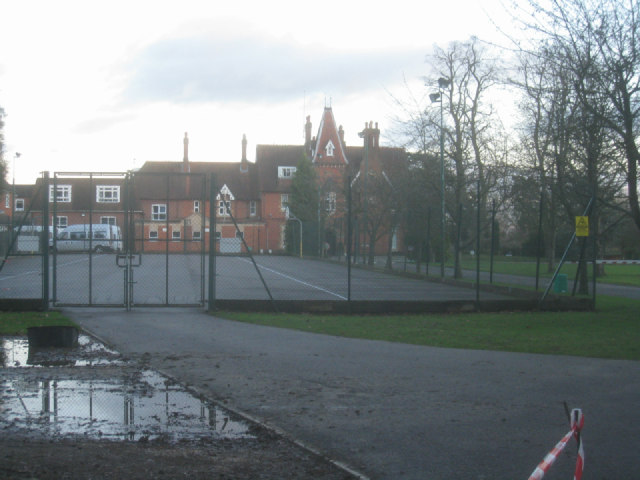
- School badge Caldicott School grounds (2013)
- Farnham Royal, Buckinghamshire, SL2 3SL; England

Information
- Type: Preparatory school
- Motto: Per Victoriam Ad Gloriam (Through victory to glory)
- Religious affiliation: Church of England
- Established: 1904
- Founder: James Heald Jenkins
- Department for Education URN: 110540 Tables
- Chairman of the Governors: Malcolm Swift
- Headmaster: Jeremy Banks
- Gender: Boys
- Age: 7 to 13
- Enrolment: 235 (2021)
- Houses: Cooper, Jenkins, McArthur & Wood
- Colour
- Former pupils: Old Caldicotians
- Website: https://www.caldicott.com/

Caldicott Preparatory School is a 7–13 boys prep school in southern Buckinghamshire, England. It was founded in 1904 by James Heald Jenkins with a total of 24 boys enrolled at the school. In November 2021, a total of 235 boys were enrolled at the school, with 105 being boarders, and the remaining 130 boys being day pupils.

== History ==
=== Founding ===
Caldicott Preparatory School was founded in Hitchin, Hertfordshire in 1904 by James Heald Jenkins who named his school after his new bride, a Theodora Caldicott Ingram. At the time of opening, the school had a total of 24 boys enrolled. In 1938 the school moved to its present site in Farnham Royal in Buckinghamshire, and became a charitable trust in 1968 under the Headmaster at the time Peter Wright. Today there are around 250 boys. The school's governors include past parents, old boys and headmasters of public schools.

The original Victorian house remains. New buildings have been created around it to provide more contemporary facilities. In 2004 the Centenary Hall was completed to provide a theatre for drama and music and a venue for functions. Although central London is only 20 miles (32 km) away the school has 40 acres (16 ha) of grounds and playing fields. Burnham Beeches, a National Nature Reserve owned by the City of London Corporation is adjacent to the grounds and is often used by pupils. Heathrow Airport is 7 miles (11 km) away.

=== Recent history ===
The school has undergone developments in recent years, primarily due to the change in Headmaster. In April 2017, Simon Doggart, who was Headmaster of Caldicott for two decades, retired. He was replaced by acting Head, Theroshene Naidoo, before Jeremy Banks was appointed as the new permanent Headmaster in April 2018.

Banks has implemented changes to the school in his time in charge, notably the removal of Saturday school for Years 3-4 and the inclusion of flexi and occasional boarding for boys in Years 3–6. Caldicott has suggested that these changes maintain the tradition of the school, while making it more inclusive for parents and an easier transition for boys.

In Tatler's recent school guide, they cited the new Deputy Head structure (having a separate Deputy Head for pastoral, academic and management) was raising the profile of academics and enhancing wellbeing provision. The guide goes on to mention that Caldicott has a 100% Common Entrance success rate which results in high-profile scholarships for many of the boys.

== Overview ==
=== Scholarships ===
The formation of the Caldicott Foundation in 2020 by Mr Banks was a first step in making more tangible this aim to realise a more noble ambition for the future of Caldicott. In the last decade alone, over 100 bursaries have been awarded. In December 2021, Caldicott launched the Hitchin Scholarship under the goal of finding academic all-rounders with good character, an appetite for learning, and a passion for a wide range of interests, who wouldn't normally be able to afford Caldicott's school fees. Using the school's connection with senior schools, this level of support was maintained for up to 18 years of age. In 2022, following the inaugural recipients of the Hitchin Scholarship joining Caldicott in September, the school was commended with having the best bursary provision in Talk Education's Innovation in Education Awards.

The successful work of the scholarship programme was enhanced when the Caldicott Development Department was founded in 2023. The goal of the department is to increase the number of bursaries offered, and enhance school facilities using generous donations from past and present parents of the school.

=== Houses ===
Each pupil in the school is a member of one of four houses. These are:

- Cooper: named after John Shewell Cooper, the School's fourth headmaster.
- Jenkins: named after Heald Jenkins, the founder and first headmaster.
- McArthur: named after Harry McArthur, an influential Leys parent who aided the School financially.
- Wood: named after F. Gordon Wood, the third headmaster of the School.

=== Awards and commendations ===
In recent years Caldicott has won, and been in contention for, a number of high-profile awards across a range of fields.

Some of these include:

- BSA's 'Supporting Junior Boarders' Award (2022)
- Winners of Talk Education's 'Bursary Provision' (2022)
- Highly Commended Pastoral Care - Muddy Stilettos Best Schools Awards (2022)
- Independent School of the Year for Sporting Provision (2019).
- Independent Prep School of the Year (2020 - finalist).
- Best Head of Prep School - Jeremy Banks (2020).

Further to this, the school's most recent Inspection by the Independent Schools Inspectorate included the following comments:

Pupils achieve high standards across the curriculum, and build knowledge and understanding in all areas of learning. This is partly due to the exemplary attitudes of pupils and their overwhelming enthusiasm, as well as excellent teaching and well planned lessons. They [pupils] display a profound sense of awe in the joy of learning and the opportunities that are afforded them across school life. A joy of life permeates the school.

== History of sexual abuse ==
On 30 September 2008 the school was the subject of a feature documentary, Chosen, transmitted on More4 as part of the "Real Stories" strand, about the sexual abuse that went on at the school during the late 1960s and early 1970s. The headmaster Peter Wright was active in this, as well as a number of other teachers, targeting boys good at sports and, to a lesser extent, in the choir. In The Guardian published on the same day, a former parent alleged that Lord Justice Scott Baker, former chairman of the board of Governors, and Headmaster Simon Doggart mishandled a case of alleged sexual abuse of their son by a teacher in the early 2000s.

Martin Carson was dismissed for sexual abuse of a pupil in 1972, and went on to teach at Chelmsford Hall School in Eastbourne, eventually becoming involved in the founding of the Harrodian School which was his last employment in education. In 2003 following the Channel 4 broadcast of an interview with two victims, he was arrested and charged, and pleaded guilty to charges assault and possessing indecent images of children in 2003.

On 4 December 2011, Peter Wright and Hugh Henry, another teacher, were charged with child sex offences alleged to have taken place between 1959 and 1970. For Henry, the charges cover his period at Gayhurst School as well as at Caldicott. They appeared in court in Aylesbury on 21 December 2011 charged with a total of 35 offences against 12 pupils. This was the second time that Peter Wright had been charged for child abuse offences; the first time, in 2003, the judge awarded a stay of proceedings predicated upon the passage of time since the offences were allegedly committed.

Hugh Henry was found guilty of 11 counts of indecency, and two of gross indecency, towards a child, and pleaded guilty. He was killed by a train shortly before he was due to return to court for sentencing, his death a presumed suicide.

On 18 December 2013 Peter Wright was convicted of sexually assaulting five pupils aged eight to 13 at Caldicott between 1959 and 1970. Wright was sentenced to 8 years' imprisonment on 6 February 2014.

Thames Valley Police on 1 May 2012 charged another former teacher, John Addrison, with sexual offences committed against children at the school between 1979 and 1981. Addrison was subsequently further charged with child sex offences committed at Moor Park School near Ludlow, Shropshire, between 1985 and 1988. He pleaded guilty and was sentenced to five years' prison but wasn't fined.

A further ex-teacher, David Geddes, was also charged in November 2012, with four charges for offences against three school-children between 1975 and 1977.

Under ex-headmaster Simon Doggart, another incident of alleged child sexual abuse was reported; the headmaster and the chairman of the board of governors, Lord Justice Scott Baker, suspended the teacher (who did not return).

== Notable alumni ==
- John Apthorp, Founder of Bejam Foods, now Iceland and Wizzard Wines, now Majestic Wines.
- Ben Castle, British jazz musician, the son of entertainer Roy Castle.
- Nick Clegg, Former Liberal Democrat MP for Sheffield Hallam, leader of the Liberal Democrats and Deputy Prime Minister of the United Kingdom.
- Rodney Craig, British fencer who competed at the 1968 and 1972 Summer Olympics.
- Robert Diament, singer/songwriter of pop band Temposhark.
- Alex Farquharson, curator and art critic, Director of Tate Britain.
- Will Hoy (died 2002), British Touring Car Champion 1991.
- Tengku Hassanal Ibrahim, regent and crown prince of Pahang, Malaysia.
- Ralph Izzard, journalist for the Daily Mail.
- Adrian Jarvis, Harlequins FC rugby union player; selected for England Saxons 2008 squad.
- Malcolm Lowry, poet and novelist.
- Wilfrid Lowry, Birkenhead Park FC rugby union player, and England player.
- Brooks Newmark, former Conservative MP for Braintree and former Minister for Civil Society.
- Ernest Saunders, former Chief executive of Guinness 1981–86, best known for being one of the "Guinness Four".
- Chris Sheasby, England rugby union player.
- Ed Stoppard, actor.
- Andrew Strauss, England cricketer and Captain.
- Kepu Tuipulotu, England rugby union player.
- Greg Fisilau, England rugby union player.
- Rekeiti Ma'asi-White, England rugby union player.
