= Peter Douty =

British Lions & Scotland international rugby union player

- Born: Peter Sime Douty; 26 October 1903 Leeds, West Yorkshire, England
- Died: 18 July 1948 (aged 44) Newton Abbot, Devon, England
- School: Sedbergh School
- University: Pembroke College, Cambridge

Rugby union career
Amateur team(s)
Years	Team	Apps	(Points)
-	Headingley		
1924	Cambridge University		
-	London Scottish		
Provincial / State sides
Years	Team	Apps	(Points)
1924	Scotland Possibles		
1926	Yorkshire		
1929	London		
International career
Years	Team	Apps	(Points)
1925-27	Barbarians	7	
1927-28	Scotland	3	
1927	British and Irish Lions		

Peter Sime Douty (26 October 1903, in Leeds, England – 18 July 1948, in Newton Abbot, Devon) was a Scotland international rugby union player. He played at scrum half but could also cover at full back.

== Rugby Union career ==
=== Amateur career ===
He played for Headingley.

He played for Cambridge University when he went to Pembroke College. He often played at full back for the Cambridge side.

He moved to play for London Scottish.

=== Provincial career ===
He played for Scotland Possibles on 27 December 1924.

He played for Yorkshire.

He played for London against Hanover in 1929. He got a knee injury in the match which kept him out of rugby for a year.

=== International career ===
He played three times for Scotland; against Wales, Australia and France in the 1927–28 season. He suffered a gash to his head in the Wales match and had to receive medical attention before returning to the field.

He also went on the 1927 British Lions tour to Argentina.

He played for the Barbarians seven times between 1925 and 1927.

== Family ==
He was a grandson of Peter Sime, of the timber merchants Bell and Sime of Dundee. Peter Douty's mother was the daughter of the timber merchant, Jean Martin Sime, born in 1876 from Dundee. She married Caeser Coulston Douty from Bristol.
