= Altar frontal from Cardet =

13th century alter front

- Artist: Johannes. Ribagorça Workshop
- Year: Second half of the 13th century
- Type: Tempera, stucco reliefs and remains of varnished metal plate on wood
- Dimensions: 97 cm × 162 cm (38 in × 64 in)
- Location: Museu Nacional d'Art de Catalunya; Barcelona

The Altar frontal from Cardet is an altar conserved at the Museu Nacional d'Art de Catalunya, in Barcelona.

== Description ==
The Altar frontal from Cardet, along with the one from Rigatell, is one of the best and most representative works from the Ribagorza workshop, so called the source of a series of works of similar style and technique.

The technique features they use in backgrounds and on frames of stucco reliefs, which were once coated with fine layers of metal and yellow varnish (known as colradura) to give them the appearance of precious metal. The pictorial style is highly narrative and uses a lot of bright colours that, in their day, with the gilding that has since been lost, must have been even brighter. These sightly works must have been in great demand, something we can deduce from the number of specimens preserved.

The frontal is presided by the Virgin and Child, enthroned inside an almond-shaped mandorla surrounded by the Tetramorph, the four symbolic beings that proclaimed the Gospel.

In the side compartments, separated by thin columns, are scenes from Christ’s childhood, beginning with the Annunciation by the angel to Mary and the Visitation by the latter to St Elizabeth. It continues with the Nativity and, behind Joseph, the Annunciation to the Shepherds, a highly descriptive scene full of detail, with landscape elements characteristic of the time. The Magi with their offerings, in the Epiphany, address the central figures. The last compartment depicts two scenes, without any architectural separation: the Slaughter of the Innocents, which is difficult to recognise as the soldiers’ spears and the slaughtered children have been lost, and the Flight into Egypt.
