= Dorothy Hartopp Radcliffe =

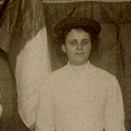
- Born: Dorothy Hartopp Yonge Radcliffe; 16 September 1887; Hersham, Surrey, England
- Died: 1959 (aged 71); Quidenham, Norfolk, England
- Occupations: Suffragette, activist, nun

Dorothy Hartopp Radcliffe (16 September 1887 – 1959) was a British suffragette, member of the WSPU, and later a Carmelite nun.

== Life ==
Radcliffe was born on 16 September 1887 in Hersham in Surrey, one of six children of Francis and Helen Radcliffe. Radcliffe was christened at St Michael and All Angels Anglican Church, Paddington, on 16 November 1887, with her full name being recorded as Dorothy Hartopp Yonge Radcliffe.

Radcliffe is found contributing small amounts of money to the £20,000 fund in the 6 February 1908 issue of Votes for Women, again in the 22 October 1908 issue and the £250,000 fund in the 2 January 1914 issue of The Suffragette. These contributions do not reflect her active membership of the WSPU.

Radcliffe appears in several photographs held by the Museum of London. She was the flag bearer at the Women's Sunday March on 21 June 1908, leading the procession which formed up on Victoria Embankment to march to Hyde Park. A Miss Radcliffe was secretary of the procession committee based at 400 King's Road, Chelsea, working with Chief Marshall Florence Haig.

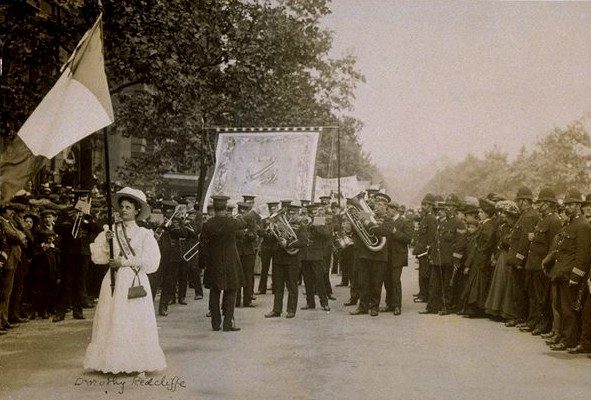
Dorothy Radcliffe with W.S.P.U colours flag at Women's Sunday

Radcliffe at left

Another picture from a week later shows Radcliffe at the front of a line of women with Dora Beedham, Hilda Dallas and Charlotte Marsh promoting the Women's Parliament on 30 June 1908. The final photograph shows her with Charlotte Marsh and Elsa Gye, preparing to welcome the release of Emmeline and Christabel Pankhurst from jail in December 1908.

She was Banner Marshal for the university graduates in the Women's March to the Albert Hall which took place on 18 June 1910. Radcliffe was Banner and Colour Captain leading the Empire Pageant for the Women's Coronation Procession on 17 June 1911.

She cannot be found in the 1911 Census when suffragettes refused to be counted.

Radcliffe was imprisoned during her suffrage campaigning. Her name appears on the Suffragette Roll of Honour, with her surname misspelt as Radclyffe. She used a false name in 1913, calling herself 'Heather Mitchell' in the list of fictitious names used by the suffragettes in 1913. She does not appear on the original arrest records as Dorothy Radcliffe, but a 'Hester Mitchell' is recorded and could be a misspelling. At some point Radcliffe converted to Roman Catholicism and became a nun. She is recorded in the 1939 Census as being an enclosed nun at the Carmelite Monastery, Rushmere, near Ipswich in Suffolk. The Carmelites moved from there to their present convent at Quidenham, Norfolk, in 1948. Radcliffe died there in early 1959 at the age of 71.
