= George Arthren McIlwaine =

George Arthren McIlwaine (c. 1905, South Africa – 31 October 1930, Calcutta, British India) was a South African rugby union player and an early twentieth century rugby union international who is known as one of the "lost lions" due to his participation on the 1927 British Lions tour to Argentina which, although retrospectively recognised as a Lions tour, did not confer test status on any of the four encounters with the Argentina national rugby union team.
