= Granville Coghlan =

British Lions international rugby union player

G B Coghlan
- Born: Granville Boyle Coghlan; 6 January 1907 Battle, East Sussex, England
- Died: 18 August 1983 (aged 76)
- School: Rugby School
- University: Clare College, Cambridge
- Occupation: Teacher

Rugby union career
- Position: lock
Amateur team(s)
| Years | Team | Apps | (Points) |
- Cambridge University RUFC
International career
| Years | Team | Apps | (Points) |
| 1927 | (United Kingdom) British Isles | 2 | (0) |

Granville Boyle Coghlan (6 January 1907 – 18 August 1983) was an educationalist and an early twentieth century rugby union international who is known as one of the "lost lions" due to his participation on the 1927 British Lions tour to Argentina which, although retrospectively recognised as a Lions tour, did not confer test status on any of the four encounters with the Argentina national rugby union team.

== Biography ==
=== Early life ===
Granville B Coghlan was born on 6 January 1907 in Battle. He was the elder son of Henry Granville Coghlan and Amy Fiennes Coghlan (née Twisleton) and had a younger brother Henry Patrick. His father was a teacher who hailed from Lancashire, himself the son of a clergyman. Henry, on moving to the Hastings area where he was married, founded a school, known as Seafield School, of which he became the headmaster. Granville's mother, Amy, was raised in Giggleswick near Settle in Yorkshire. She carried the middle name Fiennes, in common with a number of her relations. Combined with her maiden surname Twisleton, this carried the heavy implication that she was related to the Twiselton-Fiennes-Wycham family, the holders of the Baronetcy of Banbury, the current incumbent being Sir Ranulph Fiennes. The link is not fully established, although the Twiselton from whom the Baronet has inherited the name was himself from Yorkshire. What is certain is that Amy's forefather, Francis Twiselton was known as a giant of a man, standing 7'3". His stature was recorded to have passed down the generations, and may have contributed to Granville's height and weight making him ideal for the rugby union position of lock.

Granville attended Rugby School where he played both rugby and cricket.

=== Rugby career ===
He went on to Clare College, Cambridge and was awarded a rugby blue. It was from Cambridge that he was selected for the 1927 tour to Argentina. On this tour he was one of a number of uncapped players who was selected to play against the Argentina national side. He played in two of the four tests. Despite being selected for the Great Britain side, he never went on to play for his national side, England.

=== Education ===
After finishing his education, Granville followed his father's footsteps, becoming a teacher and went on to become the headmaster of Seafield School, Hastings. In turn, his son Terence became the headmaster until the school's closure.

Seafield School was a school for boys aged between 8 and 13. It was located on Collington Lane West, one of three schools on the lane the others being Falconbury, also a boys' school and Effingham, for girls. These three schools were visited by Queen Elizabeth II in the 1960s. Seafield itself was used as quarters for a Canadian Anti Aircraft Battery that was serving in defence of Bexhill and Cooden Beach during the Second World War. Seafield and its two counterparts were closed in the early 1970s to open up land to be used for building new homes. However, their crests were preserved in a specially dedicated stained-glass window in the nearby St Mark's church of the parish of Bexhill. The installation and dedication of the Seafield School memorial window happened in June 1963 and was dedicated to Henry Granville Coghlan, the founder of the school, and his wife Amy and son Patrick.

=== Personal life ===
In 1932, Granville married Eileen Heückendorff and their eldest son, Terence Granville, was born in May 1934. Terence died on 2 October 2009 in Weybridge UK. He leaves his wife Beverley, sons Simon Granville Gregory Coghlan, Robin Patrick Coghlan, Anthony Coghlan and his daughter, Nicola Scrivener.
