= Robert Kelly (rugby union) =

Scottish rugby union player (1907–1975)

- Born: Robert Forrest Kelly; 12 March 1907 Edinburgh, Scotland
- Died: 23 February 1975 (aged 67) Edinburgh

Rugby union career
International career
Years	Team	Apps	(Points)
1927-28	Scotland	4	
1927	British and Irish Lions		

Robert Forrest Kelly (12 March 1907, Edinburgh – 23 February 1975, Edinburgh) was a Scottish rugby union player.

He was a Three-Quarter Centre, and played four times for Scotland, against Wales, Australia, England and France in the 1927–8 season.

He also went on the 1927 British Lions tour to Argentina.
