= John Synge (rugby union) =

Irish rugby union player

- Full name: John Samuel Synge
- Born: 12 July 1906 Dublin, Ireland
- Died: 26 August 1982 (aged 76)

Rugby union career
- Position: Wing-forward
International career
Years	Team	Apps	(Points)
1929	Ireland	1	(0)

John Samuel Synge (12 July 1906 — 26 August 1982) was an Irish international rugby union player.

Synge, born in Dublin, was educated at St Columba's College and Clare College, Cambridge. His parents were Samuel Synge and Mary Harmar, both physicians and medical missionaries to China.

A Cambridge rugby blue, Synge was a robust forward who was at his best on the loose and gained his only Ireland cap as a wing-forward, deputing for Charles Payne against Scotland at Lansdowne Road in 1929.

== See also ==
- List of Ireland national rugby union players
