= Dora Beedham =

British suffragette (1879–1969)

- Born: Dora Spong; 3 June 1879; Balham, London, England
- Died: 1969 (aged 89–90); Surrey, England
- Occupations: Nurse and suffragette
- Organisation: Women's Social and Political Union
- Known for: Suffragette activism
- Political party: Independent Labour Party
- Spouse(s): R. John Beedham (1879–1975), Quaker and artists woodcut engraver
- Relatives: Mother: Frances Elizabeth Scott (1843–1929) Father: James Osborne Spong (1839–1925) created Spong & Co. Sisters: Minnie Frances Spong (1869–1953); Annie Eliza Spong (1870–1957); Florence Spong (1873–1944); Irene Osborn Spong (1882–1960). Brothers: James William Spong (1879–1944), succeeded his father in running Spong & Co., Francis Osborne Spong (1875–1878).
- Honours: Hunger Strike Medal for Valour

Procession of Suffragettes on The Strand on 30 June 1908. The Suffragettes are (left to right) Dorothy Hartopp Radcliffe, Dora Spong who appears to be holding a pile of Votes for Women newspapers, Hilda Dallas and Charlotte Marsh carrying the placard

Dora Beedham (née Spong; 3 June 1879 – 1969) was an English nurse from the social activist Spong Family and suffragette who joined the Women's Social and Political Union (WSPU) in 1908 and was imprisoned and force-fed.

== Biography ==
Born as Dora Spong in Balham, London in 1879, she was the fourth daughter of Frances Elizabeth Scott (1843-1929) and father James Osborne Spong (1839-1925) who ran a labour-saving device engineering company, Spong & Co, who made and sold devices which may 'help women move out of the kitchen' like coffee grinders, corkscrews, knife cleaners, burglar and fire alarms, animal traps and a meat mincer which had sold 200,000 by 1882. Spong & Co. mincers were used in the largest public and private institutions in the land.

Her mother was a vegetarian - Dora and the other daughters followed suit. In June 1910 Dora Spong began training as a midwife, a career she was still following in 1915. She married Ralph John Beedham (1879-1975) on 14 October 1910 with whom she had two children:, Ruth (born 1914) and David (born 1918. Ralph was a woodcut engraver for artists (a formschneider), a Quaker and pacifist, and conscientious objector during World War I. Both vegetarians, they had farmed in Herefordshire, but later had to give it up, living with the Spong family. They were known to wear loose clothing and sandals.

== Imprisonment and protest ==
Dora Spong's parents supported her activism and that of her sisters. Their mother Frances Spong attended WSPU demonstrations.

Initially working in the poorest areas of London, Tottenham and Battersea, Spong was a nurse and midwife and sanitary inspector to slum residents. She was a member of the Independent Labour Party, Finsbury branch. She joined the militant suffragette activists, the Women's Social and Political Union (WSPU), in 1908.

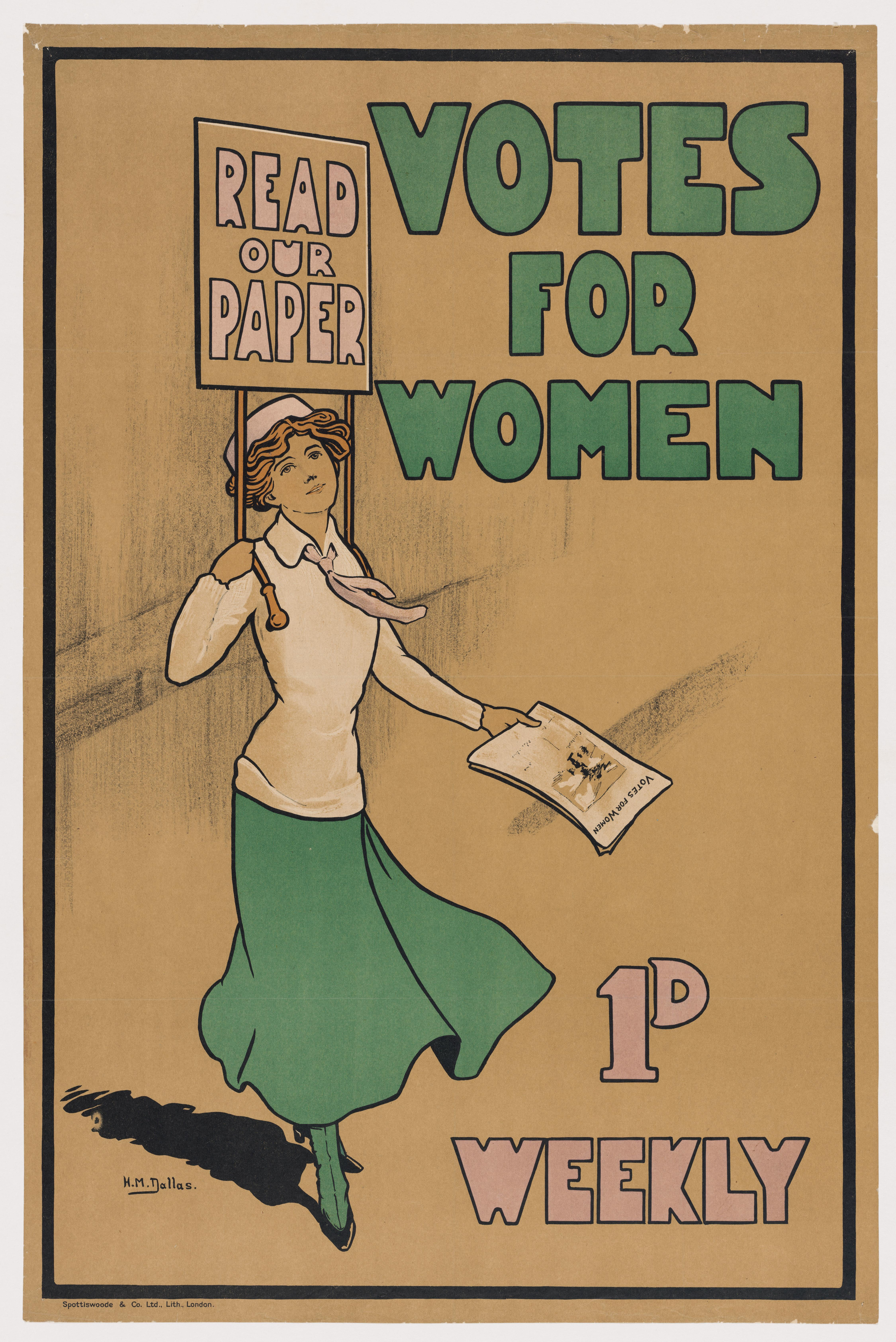
votes for women poster

Spong was involved in WSPU poster protests, where small groups of women carrying and selling Votes for Women or other publications for handing out could progress through London streets, raising awareness and publicity, with less risk of violent reactions from objectors, compared to mass demonstrations.

A picture in the Museum of London shows Spong with Dorothy Hartopp Radcliffe, Hilda Dallas and Charlotte Marsh with a placard promoting the "Women's Parliament" in Caxton Hall on 30 June 1908. Following that event, the suffragettes tried to march from Caxton Hall to the House of Commons into a crowd of around 10,000 who tried to harass them, with only 1,700 police to keep order, Spong was amongst the seventy-five suffragettes were arrested in the ensuing aggression. She was charged for the first time, the next day on 1 July 1908, for obstruction and sentenced to a month in HM Prison Holloway. Her fellow members of Finsbury ILP wrote to her in prison in support and 'admiration of the courage and determination in submitting to the onus of the prison cell in the women's cause'. Spong became ill and was released early. Another arrest along with a hundred suffragettes marching on the House of Commons on 12 July 1909 has no complete record of her sentence. Only a month after her marriage, in November 1910, Beedham (née Spong) was arrested at Black Friday; as with other suffragettes, no charges brought.

In 1911, Beedham was one of the seventeen WSPU members of the forty-two signatories to the petition from Ellen Avery to Constance Lytton's brother Lord Lytton expressing gratitude for his faith in women's suffrage movement such that "in the years to come the Women of our Race - strong in the Freedom that you have done so much to win - will abundantly justify that faith."

Beedham's name was not found on the 1911 Census nor are her sisters apart from Annie (when many suffragettes refused to be 'counted' without the right to vote in a boycott of the census).

In 1912, she was charged with breaking windows with a hammer, with Constance Moore who had a poker at Westbourne Grove Post Office. Their sentence was two months with hard labour in Holloway Prison. She was awarded a Hunger Strike Medal 'For Valour'.

From 1920 to 1936 she, her husband and family were living in Hendon in North London, in the latter year moving to Finchley where they were still living in 1949. She died in Surrey in 1969.

== Legacy ==
Beedham's grand-daughter Joanna Wickenden Ibarra wrote about her brother Peter discovering her WSPU certificate signed by Emmeline Pankhurst. The certificate stated she was 'ever ready to obey the call of duty' and her Holloway brooch - a portcullis with a broken chain - which her family knew from childhood 'celebrated victory in the fight for women's suffrage.' Her great-nephew Roger Spong was an English international rugby player and a director of her father's company (which continued in business until the hardware division was finally taken over by Salters in the 1980s).

== Spong Family ==
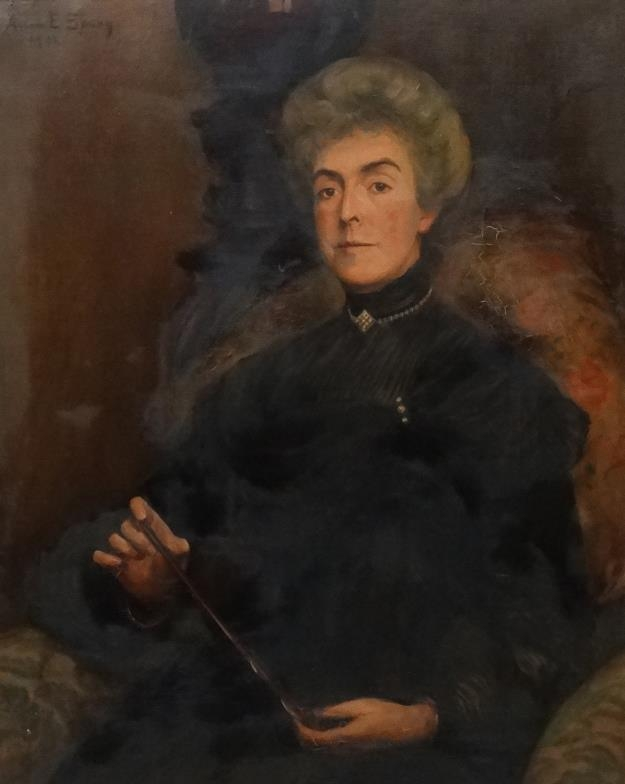
Frances Elizabeth Spong painted by her daughter Annie Spong in 1902

The Spong Family were a family of political and social activists. The children of Frances Elizabeth Scott and James Osborne Spong were: Minnie Frances Spong (1869–1953); Dora Spong (1879–1969); Annie Eliza Spong (1870-1957); Florence Spong (1873–1944) and Irene Osborn Spong (1882–1960). There were also two brothers: James William Spong (1879–1944), who succeeded his father in running Spong & Co., and Francis Osborne Spong (1875–1878).

=== Minnie 'Frances' Spong ===
The oldest daughter Minnie Spong (1863 – 19 June 1953), who became a teacher in Africa, wanted to be known as 'Frances' after their carnivore father named his meat mincing gadget 'the Minnie', and she only returned to Britain in 1911.

=== Annie Spong ===
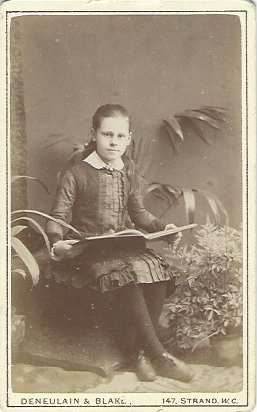
Annie Spong photographed in 1880

Annie Eliza Spong (1870–1957) was born in Streatham in London. She was a suffragette, embroiderer and portrait artist who painted several Lord Mayors of London in her career. Active from 1888 when she was a student at the Herkomer Art School to at least 1910. She was unmarried but lived with a fellow artist Joseph Sydell, whom she met at art college. Annie took up dancing under the direction of Raymond Duncan, whose sister Isadora was more well known for modern expressive dance. She opened the Spong School in Hampstead in 1919, where Spong Rhythmic Dancing was taught and which in 1920 became known as Natural Movement Dancing. With her sister the singer Irene Spong she performed in the Greek drama Lysistrata at the Royal Court Theatre.

=== Irene Spong ===
Sister Irene Osborn Spong (1882 – 21 June 1960) was a singer and put on concerts to raise money for the WSPU, and gave elocution classes to suffragette speakers. Annie danced whilst Irene sang, and spoke of the balance achieved from gymnastic dance moves: 'our awkwardness drops away, and we become more evenly balanced in body and mind, and instinctively become more human'. Irene also was imprisoned in Holloway for suffrage activism, and although married to her father's company managing clerk, Norman Parley in 1910, she retained her maiden name for her singing career.

With Annie, Irene performed in Lysistrata, a Greek drama at the Royal Court Theatre.

=== Florence Spong ===
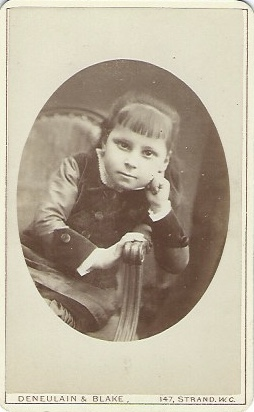
Florence Spong in 1879

Another sister, Florence (1873 – 30 March 1944), was a weaver, dressmaker and made lace and wood-carvings. She studied lace-making in Spain and wood-carving under Hubert von Herkomer.

Florence and her sister Minnie Spong became poultry farmers in Felbridge, East Grinstead and advertised in Votes for Women for female students. With her sister Dora Spong she joined the WSPU in 1908. Florence was sentenced to one month's imprisonment for stone-throwing in June 1909, and went on hunger strike and was given another two months' sentence on Black Friday in November 1910. Her signature is on the Holloway banner made by WSPU members in prison, now in the Museum of London.
