= Edward Taylor (rugby union) =

British Lions & Scotland international rugby union player

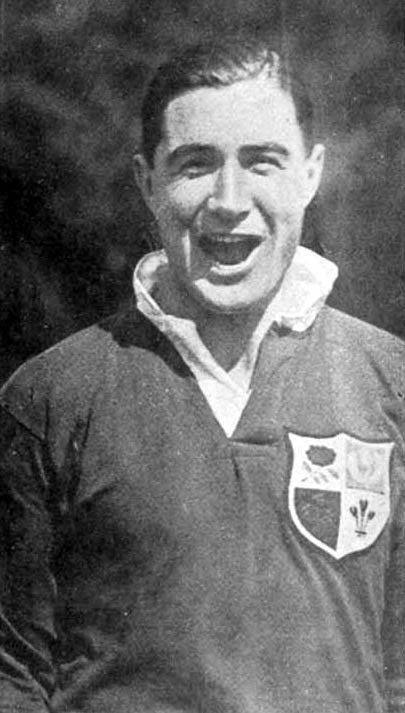
- Taylor during the tour to Argentina in 1927
- Born: Edward Graham Taylor; 3 July 1907
- Died: 13 September 1959 (aged 52)
- University: University of Oxford

Rugby union career
- Position: Wing
International career
Years	Team	Apps	(Points)
1927	Scotland	2	(0)
1927	British Isles	3	(9)

Edward Graham Taylor (3 July 1907 – 13 September 1959) was a Scottish rugby union player.

He was a wing and played twice for Scotland, against Wales and Australia in 1927.

He also went on the 1927 British Lions tour to Argentina. He played in three out of the four test matches on the tour, including the third test on 14 August where he scored three tries. He also played four games against other opposition during the tour.
