= Ernie Hammett =

British Lions & England international rugby union player

Ernest Hammett
- Full name: Ernest Dyer Galbraith Hammett
- Born: 15 October 1891 Radstock, Somerset, England
- Died: 23 June 1947 (aged 55) Hove, Sussex, England
- School: Newport High School

Rugby union career
- Position: Centre
International career
Years	Team	Apps	(Points)
1920–22	England	8	(12)
1927	British Lions		

Ernest Dyer Galbraith Hammett (15 October 1891 – 23 June 1947) was an English international rugby union player.

Hammett was born in Radstock, Somerset, but grew up in Newport, Wales, attending Newport High School. He played association football for Treharris and Newport County, while also gaining a cap for Welsh Amateurs in a 1912 international against England. His rugby was predominantly played in Wales, which included three seasons with Newport RFC.

From 1920 to 1922, Hammett was capped eight times for England as a centre three-quarter. His debut match was against Wales, which had also called him up, unaware that he had committed to England.

Hammett toured Argentina with the British Lions in 1927 and played three of the four matches against the Pumas, contributing 41-points through a try, drop goal, two penalties and 14 conversions.

== See also ==
- List of British & Irish Lions players
- List of England national rugby union players
