= Brian Black (sportsman) =

British sportsman (1907–1940)

- Full name: Brian Henry Black
- Born: 27 May 1907 South Africa
- Died: 29 July 1940 (aged 33) Chilmark, Wiltshire, England

Rugby union career
- Position: Lock / Flanker / No. 8
International career
| Years | Team | Apps | (Points) |
| 1930–33 | England | 10 | (30) |
| 1930 | Great Britain | 5 | (4) |
Medal record
Bobsleigh
World Championships
| Gold medal – first place | 1937 Cortina d'Ampezzo | Two-man |
| Gold medal – first place | 1937 St. Moritz | Four-man |

Brian Henry Black (27 May 1907 - 29 July 1940) was an English rugby union international and bobsledder who competed in the 1930s.

At the 1937 FIBT World Championships, Black won gold medals in both the two-man and four-man bobsleigh events.
