= James Baxter (sportsman) =

English rugby union footballer and sailor

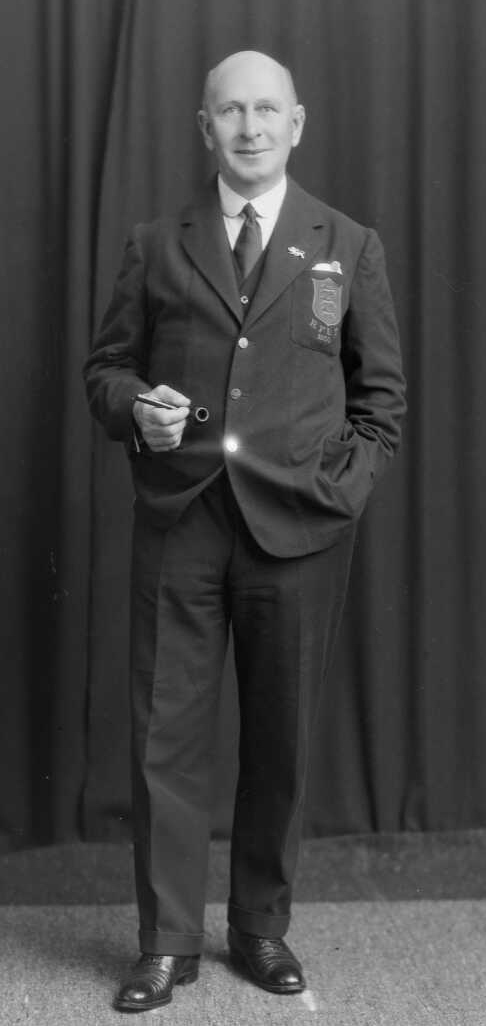
- Baxter in New Zealand in 1930
- Born: James Baxter; 8 June 1870 Rock Ferry, England
- Died: 4 July 1940 (aged 70) Rock Ferry, England

Rugby union career
- Position: Forward
Senior career
Years	Team	Apps	(Points)
- Birkenhead Park FC
International career
Years	Team	Apps	(Points)
1900	England	3	

Medal record

Sailing

Representing Great Britain

Olympic Games
Silver medal – second place	1908 London	12 metre

James Baxter (8 June 1870 – 5 July 1940) was an English rugby union player and manager.

Baxter was also a crew member of the British boat Mouchette, which won a silver medal at the 1908 Summer Olympics for sailing in the 12-metre class.

In 1927, he was president of the Rugby Football Union. He managed the British and Irish Lions tour to Argentina in 1927 and the 1930 tour to New Zealand and Australia.
