= Cardet =

Commune in Occitanie, France

- Commune
- Coat of arms
- Location of Cardet
- Location within France Location within Occitanie
- Coordinates: 44°01′39″N 4°04′52″E
- Country: France
- Region: Occitania
- Department: Gard
- Arrondissement: Le Vigan
- Canton: Quissac

Government
  - Mayor (2020–2026): Fabien Cruveiller
- Area^{1}: 8.29 km^{2} (3.20 sq mi)
- Elevation: 106 m (348 ft)
- Highest elevation: 166 m (545 ft)
- Lowest elevation: 98 m (322 ft)
- Population (2023): 933
  - Density: 113/km^{2} (291/sq mi)
- Time zone: UTC+01:00 (CET)
  - Summer (DST): UTC+02:00 (CEST)
- INSEE/Postal code: 30068 /30350
- ^{1} French Land Register data, which excludes lakes, ponds, glaciers > 1 km^{2} (0.386 sq mi or 247 acres) and river estuaries.

Cardet (French pronunciation: [kaʁdɛ]; Occitan: Cardet) is a commune in the Gard department in southern France.

== Geography ==
=== Climate ===
Cardet has a hot-summer Mediterranean climate (Köppen climate classification Csa). The average annual temperature in Cardet is 14.6 °C (58.3 °F). The average annual rainfall is 974.6 mm (38.37 in) with September as the wettest month. The temperatures are highest on average in July, at around 24.1 °C (75.4 °F), and lowest in January, at around 6.3 °C (43.3 °F). The highest temperature ever recorded in Cardet was 43.0 °C (109.4 °F) on 28 June 2019; the coldest temperature ever recorded was −12.8 °C (9.0 °F) on 3 January 1971.

Climate data for Cardet (1991−2020 normals, extremes 1969−present)
Month	Jan	Feb	Mar	Apr	May	Jun	Jul	Aug	Sep	Oct	Nov	Dec	Year
Record high °C (°F)	22.5 (72.5)	24.0 (75.2)	28.1 (82.6)	31.2 (88.2)	36.0 (96.8)	43.0 (109.4)	40.5 (104.9)	40.9 (105.6)	37.3 (99.1)	32.2 (90.0)	25.8 (78.4)	21.1 (70.0)	43.0 (109.4)
Mean daily maximum °C (°F)	11.1 (52.0)	12.8 (55.0)	16.9 (62.4)	19.7 (67.5)	24.0 (75.2)	28.5 (83.3)	31.7 (89.1)	31.4 (88.5)	26.2 (79.2)	20.5 (68.9)	14.9 (58.8)	11.5 (52.7)	20.8 (69.4)
Daily mean °C (°F)	6.3 (43.3)	7.2 (45.0)	10.6 (51.1)	13.4 (56.1)	17.4 (63.3)	21.4 (70.5)	24.1 (75.4)	23.8 (74.8)	19.3 (66.7)	15.1 (59.2)	10.1 (50.2)	6.8 (44.2)	14.6 (58.3)
Mean daily minimum °C (°F)	1.4 (34.5)	1.5 (34.7)	4.3 (39.7)	7.2 (45.0)	10.9 (51.6)	14.3 (57.7)	16.5 (61.7)	16.1 (61.0)	12.5 (54.5)	9.7 (49.5)	5.2 (41.4)	2.1 (35.8)	8.5 (47.3)
Record low °C (°F)	−12.8 (9.0)	−10.0 (14.0)	−9.7 (14.5)	−4.6 (23.7)	0.8 (33.4)	5.4 (41.7)	8.3 (46.9)	7.2 (45.0)	1.4 (34.5)	−3.2 (26.2)	−7.8 (18.0)	−10.2 (13.6)	−12.8 (9.0)
Average precipitation mm (inches)	74.7 (2.94)	50.9 (2.00)	60.9 (2.40)	78.8 (3.10)	69.1 (2.72)	50.9 (2.00)	34.6 (1.36)	50.7 (2.00)	161.8 (6.37)	146.0 (5.75)	115.1 (4.53)	81.1 (3.19)	974.6 (38.37)
Average precipitation days (≥ 1.0 mm)	6.5	4.9	5.3	7.0	6.9	4.8	4.0	4.6	5.4	8.1	8.1	6.7	72.4
Source: Météo-France

== Population ==
Historical population
Year	Pop.	±% p.a.
1968	542	—
1975	472	−1.96%
1982	503	+0.91%
1990	569	+1.55%
1999	643	+1.37%
2007	809	+2.91%
2012	849	+0.97%
2017	871	+0.51%
2023	933	+1.15%
Source: INSEE

== See also ==
- Altar frontal from Cardet
- Communes of the Gard department
