= Charles Payne (rugby union) =

Irish rugby union player

- Full name: Charles Trevor Payne
- Born: 18 August 1905 Belfast, Ireland
- Died: 12 July 1980 (aged 74)
- School: Malvern College

Rugby union career
- Position: Hooker
International career
Years	Team	Apps	(Points)
1926–30	Ireland	16	(0)
1927	British Lions		

Charles Trevor Payne (18 August 1905 – 12 July 1980) was an Irish international rugby union player.

Payne was born in Belfast and educated at Malvern College.

A hooker, Payne was a lively player and strong scrummager. He played his rugby for Belfast club North of Ireland and from 1926 to 1930 represented Ireland, gaining a total of 16 caps. In 1927, Payne toured Argentina with the British Lions and played all four matches against the Pumas.

== See also ==
- List of Ireland national rugby union players
- List of British & Irish Lions players
