= Wilfrid Lowry =

England international rugby union player

- Born: Wilfrid Malbon Lowry; 14 July 1900 Wallasey, Merseyside
- Died: 4 July 1974 (aged 73)
- School: The Leys School
- Notable relative: Malcolm Lowry

Rugby union career
- Position: Wing
Amateur team(s)
Years	Team	Apps	(Points)
- Birkenhead Park FC
Senior career
Years	Team	Apps	(Points)
	Birkenhead Park FC	2	
International career
Years	Team	Apps	(Points)
1920	England	2	(0)

Wilfrid Malbon Lowry (/ˈlaʊri/; 14 July 1900, Wallasey – 4 July 1974, Heswall) was a rugby union wing who played for Birkenhead Park FC and for England in 1920.

== Personal life ==
Lowry was born on Sandrock Road, in Wallasey and grew up in New Brighton, Wirral, in north west England, and was the second son of Evelyn Boden and Arthur Lowry, a cotton broker with roots in Cumberland. He had three brothers, one of whom was the noted novelist Malcolm Lowry, who was author of Under the Volcano (1947). Like his other three brothers, he was distant from his mother, and instead grew close to his nanny.

Wilfrid was sent to Caldicott School, and later to The Leys School in Cambridge (the school made famous by the novel Goodbye, Mr. Chips) where all the brothers were educated. In 1912, the family moved to Caldy on another part of the Wirral peninsula. Their home was mock Tudor estate on two acres with a tennis court, small golf course and a maid, a cook and a nanny. On occasion, Wilfrid would look after his younger brothers. Arthur Lowry was extremely keen on sport, and built the family their own gymnasium while at Caldy. His brother Malcolm won a local golfing championship, but quit shortly afterwards, and Wilfrid was the only one of the brothers to achieve success in sport.

Wilfrid was a keen motorcyclist, and used to take his brothers around the Wirral on the back of his Sunbeam bike. Malcolm refers to Sunbeam motorcycles in two of his short stories: Enter One In Sumptuous Armour and Elephant and Colosseum.

Wilfrid's tastes in literature were conservative - Jeffery Farnol, Ian Hay, and G. A. Henty. While these included adventure stories which would influence the older novelist Malcolm, it was their older brother Stuart who introduced Malcolm to more highbrow literature.

== Rugby career ==
Lowry played for Birkenhead Park FC.

Unusually, Lowry received his first cap for England against Wales on 17 January 1920, without actually playing. Lowry was photographed with the team, and presented with his cap, but was replaced by Harold Day (then representing the Army) just before kick-off. The selectors felt that the conditions would suit Day better and he scored and converted England's only try of the game. Day said:

[I was] fetched out of my seat in the stand to play for England against Wales. It poured with rain the whole match, and the ground was churned into a dreadful mess.

Day in fact scored England's only points in the match. W. J. A. Davies was also left out of the selection, leading the captain Jenny Greenwood to say that "the selection committee were not very bright".

Lowry received another cap in the next game against France on 31 January 1920, and on this occasion, he actually took to the field.
