= Tony Novis =

England international rugby union player (1906–1997)

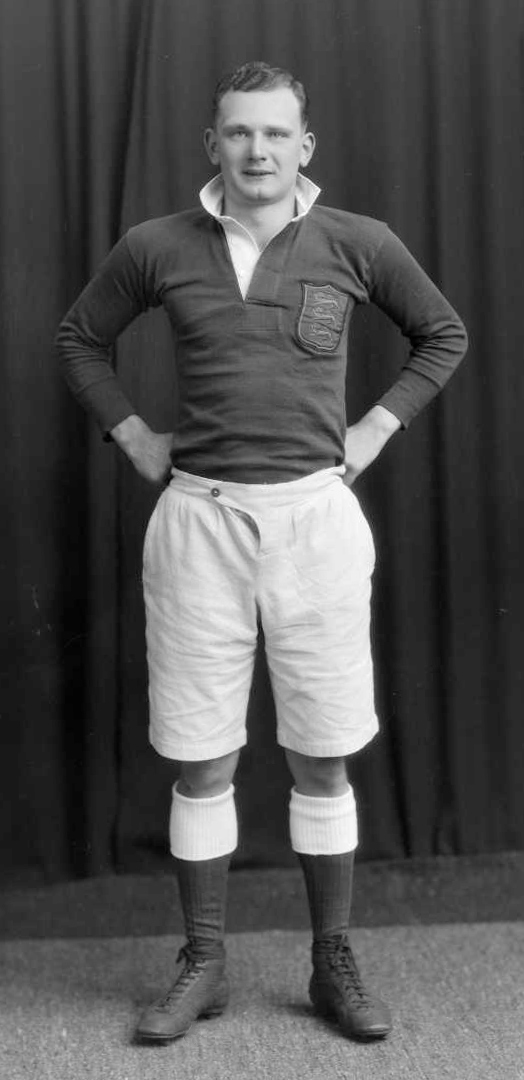
- Novis in New Zealand in 1930
- Born: Anthony Leslie Novis; 22 September 1906
- Died: 2 November 1997 (aged 91) Cheltenham, Gloucestershire

Rugby union career
- Position: Wing
International career
Years	Team	Apps	(Points)
1929–1933	England	10	(Pts:18; Tries:6)

Anthony Leslie Novis (22 September 1906 – 2 November 1997) was a rugby union international who represented England from 1929 to 1933. He also captained the English team.

Novis made his international debut on 16 March 1929 at Murrayfield in the Scotland vs England match. Of the 10 matches he played for his national side, he was on the winning side on 4 occasions. He played his final match for England on 18 March 1933 at Murrayfield in the Scotland vs England match.
