= Frank Hulme =

British Lions & England international rugby union player

- Full name: Frank Croft Hulme
- Born: 31 August 1881 Oxton, Cheshire, England
- Died: 5 September 1935 (aged 54) Birkenhead, Cheshire, England
- School: Birkenhead School

Rugby union career
- Position: Halfback
International career
Years	Team	Apps	(Points)
1903–05	England	4	(0)
1904	British Lions	1	(0)

Frank Croft Hulme (31 August 1881 – 5 September 1935) was an English international rugby union player.

Born in Oxton, Cheshire, Hulme was educated at Birkenhead School and earned his first Cheshire trial while still a schoolboy. He formed a half-back partnership with "Toggie" Kendall in matches for Birkenhead Park and Cheshire.

Hulme debuted for England in the 1903 Home Nations, featuring in two fixtures. He played a match against Australia in Sydney while touring with the 1904 British Lions and the following year gained another two England caps.

== See also ==
- List of England national rugby union players
- List of British & Irish Lions players
