= Anthony Hawke (judge, born 1895) =

British judge (1895–1964)

Sir Edward Anthony Hawke in 1954

Sir Edward Anthony Hawke (26 July 1895 – 25 September 1964) was a British judge and the Common Serjeant of London from 1954 to 1959 and Recorder of London from 1959 to 1964.

== Biography ==
The son of the judge Sir John Anthony Hawke (1869–1941) and Winifred Edith Laura (née Stevens), he was educated at Charterhouse School and in 1914 went to Magdalen College, Oxford. He left Magdalen to serve during World War I and after did not return to Oxford, instead studying law. He was called to the Bar by the Middle Temple in 1920 and joined the Western Circuit and the Devon sessions.

He married the widow Evelyn Audrey Lee Davies (1905/6–1977) in 1931 and they had a daughter. His practice was mainly centred at the Central Criminal Court where he was junior prosecuting counsel in 1932, third senior prosecuting counsel in 1937, second senior prosecuting counsel in 1942, and senior prosecuting counsel from 1945 to 1950. Here among others he prosecuted the murderers Neville Heath and Daniel Raven. Hawke was the Recorder of Bath from 1939 to 1950 and the Deputy Chairman of the Hertfordshire Quarter Sessions from 1940 to 1950. He became a Bencher of his Inn in 1942 and in 1950 was appointed Chairman of the County of London Quarter Sessions. In 1954 he was knighted and in the same year he succeeded Hugh Loveday Beazley as Common Serjeant, the second most senior permanent judge of the Central Criminal Court; in 1959 he was appointed Recorder of London, the senior Circuit Judge at the Central Criminal Court, hearing trials of criminal offences. One of the last cases he tried as Recorder at the Old Bailey was that of Christine Keeler who was accused of perjury.

In 1962 Hawke became Treasurer of his Inn. He had an enthusiastic interest in cricket and also enjoyed golf. He was the editor of the fifteenth edition of Roscoe's Criminal Evidence.

Hawke died in Italy on 25 September 1964 while on holiday at Menaggio on Lake Como. He was succeeded as Recorder of London by Carl Aarvold.
