= Henry Rew =

British Lions & England international rugby union player

Henry Rew (11 November 1906 – 11 December 1940 (aged 34)) was an English rugby union player. He won 10 caps for England between 1929 and 1934, and four for the British Lions on their 1930 tour. He was killed at Nibeiwa Fort while serving with the Royal Tank Regiment.
