= Birkenhead Park FC =

English rugby union club, based in Birkenhead

(England) Birkenhead Park
- Full name: Birkenhead Park Rugby Club
- Union: Cheshire RFU
- Founded: 1871; 155 years ago
- Location: Birkenhead, Merseyside, England
- Ground: Upper Park (Capacity: 2,000)
- Chairman: Barry Fitzgerald
- President: Richard Morris
- Captain: Sean Mooney
- League: Regional 1 North West
- 2025–26: 8th
Team kit

Official website
- birkenheadparkrfc.rfu.club

Birkenhead Park Football Club is an English rugby union team based in Birkenhead, Wirral. The club operates five senior teams, a ladies team (Birkenhead Park Panthers) and six junior sides. The men's senior team play in Regional 1 North West, the fifth level of the English rugby union system, following promotion as champions of Regional 2 North West in 2023–24.

== History ==
Birkenhead Park was formed in 1871, the same year as the Rugby Football Union, from the amalgamation of two smaller clubs, Claughton and Birkenhead Wanderers during the 1871–72 season. After an initial period where the club failed to find any form, the season of 1877–78 saw the team losing only two matches from nineteen played. The club was central to the formation of the Cheshire County Union, and in 1887 Birkenhead Park was chosen as the venue for the Home Nations clash between Wales and Ireland; the first time a Home Nations Championship game was played on neutral soil.

The club has a rich history and have hosted the New Zealand All Blacks team on four occasions most recently in 1978 and in 1984 they hosted the North of England's match against Romania.

The club has won two promotions in the 25 years of club rugby – winning South Lancashire and Cheshire Division One and North 2 West in consecutive seasons in the early 2000s.

== Ground ==
Birkenhead Park have been based at Upper Park since 1885. Ground capacity was listed in 1990 by a club official as being 8,000 (all standing) with club house, changing rooms and flood lights for the main pitch, and old videos appear to show a large grandstand. By modern safety standards this estimate seems very generous and there is no longer a grandstand, so a revised figure of 2,000 has been used.

== Honours ==
- Cheshire Cup winners (4): 1878, 1879, 1881, 2008
- Euromanx South Lancs/Cheshire 1 champions: 2000–01
- North 1 West champions (2): 2001–02, 2014–15
- Cheshire Vase winners: 2016
- North 1 (east v west) promotion play-off winner: 2016–17

== Notable former players ==
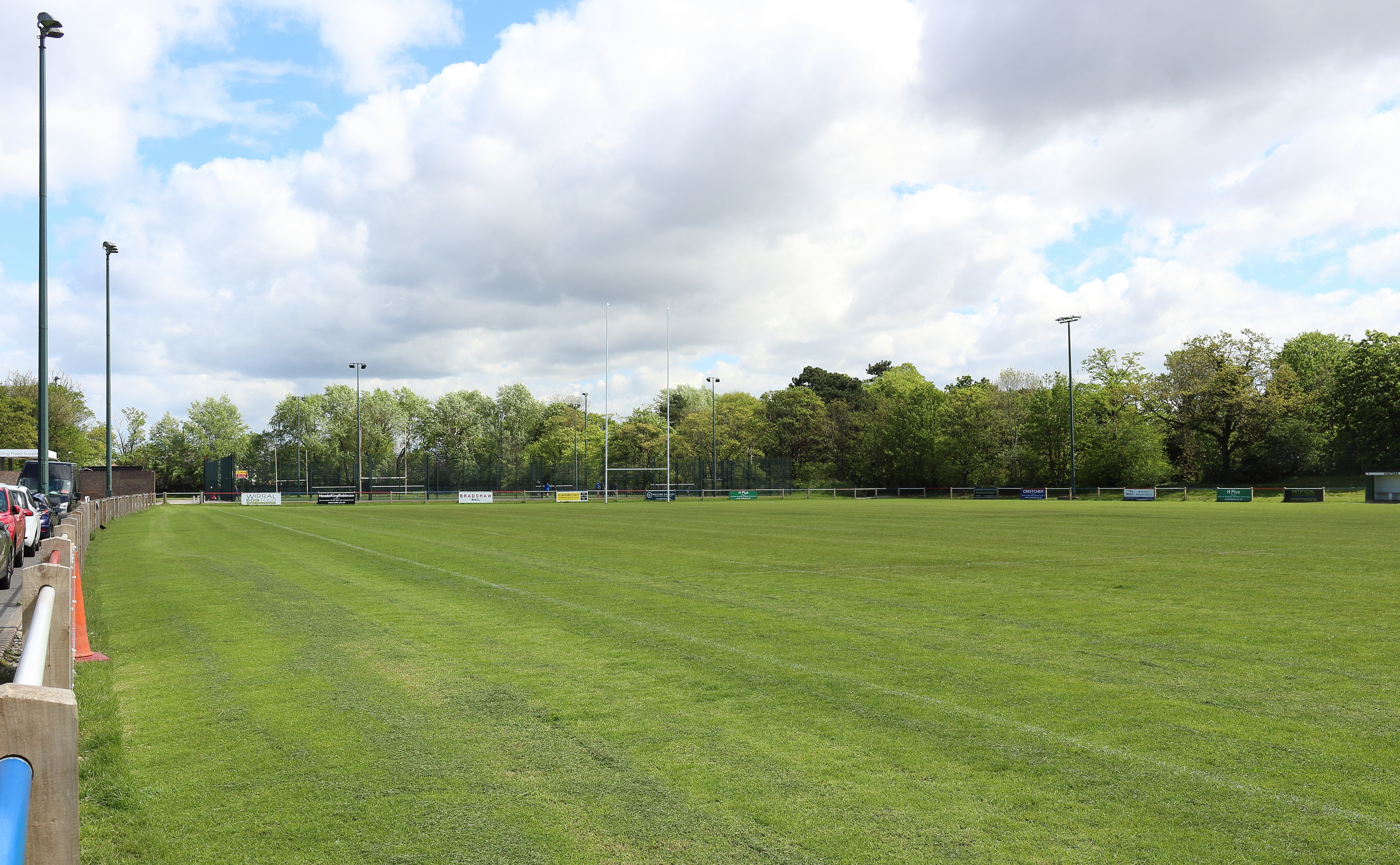
The pitches

=== British Lions ===
- (United Kingdom) John Francis Ashby 1910
- (United Kingdom) Paul Robert Clauss 1891
- (United Kingdom) Elliot Nicholson (1899)
- (United Kingdom) George Hancock (1936 British Lions tour to Argentina)
- (United Kingdom) Frank Croft Hulme (1904)
- (United Kingdom) Reg Maxwell (1924)
- (United Kingdom) Tom Knowles (1930)

=== International players while at Birkenhead Park ===
- (England) Harry Alexander
- (England) James Baxter
- (Scotland) Paul Robert Clauss
- (England) Wilfrid Lowry
- (England) C. S. Edgar
- (England) Frank Croft Hulme
- (England) P. D. Kendall
- (England) J. C. Marquis
- (England) B. B. Middleton
- (England) Elliot Nicholson
- (Scotland) John Paterson
- (England) C. Phillips
- (England) J. J. Ravenscroft
- (Israel) J. Feldman

=== Other notable players ===
- (Wales) Ian Buckett
- (England) Austin Healey
- Richard Downend (a notable cricketer)
