= Hugh Loveday Beazley =

British judge (1880–1964)

Sir Hugh Loveday Beazley (16 October 1880 – 17 July 1964) was a County Court Judge (1934–1937), a Judge of the Mayor's and City of London Court (1937–1942) and the Common Serjeant of London (1942-1953).

He was the son of Robert Clover Beazley MP (1850–1925) and Harriet Gertrude (née Williams). During World War I Beazley was promoted to 2nd Lieutenant in the Liverpool Regiment on 22 November 1916.

In 1934, Beazley was appointed a County Court Judge of Circuit 38 (Edmonton & Wood Green, Ilford, etc), while from 1937 to 1942 he was judge of the Mayor's and City of London Court. In 1942, he was appointed Common Serjeant of London, the second most senior permanent judge of the Central Criminal Court after the Recorder of London. He held the post until his retirement in December 1953. From 1946 he was appointed to the Lieutenancy for the City of London and was knighted in 1953. He was a member of the Oxford and Cambridge Club.

Beazley married Beatrice Constance Veasey. Their son was Wing Commander Hugh John Beazley, DFC (1916–2011), a famed World War II Royal Air Force fighter pilot. Another son was Lieutenant Robert Arthur Cecil Beazley of the King's Regiment (Liverpool) (1912–1944) who was killed on active service in Burma.

Beazley died in 1964 aged 83. He was succeeded as Common Serjeant by Edward Anthony Hawke.
