= Carl Aarvold =

English rugby union player and barrister

His Honour Sir Carl Aarvold OBE TD
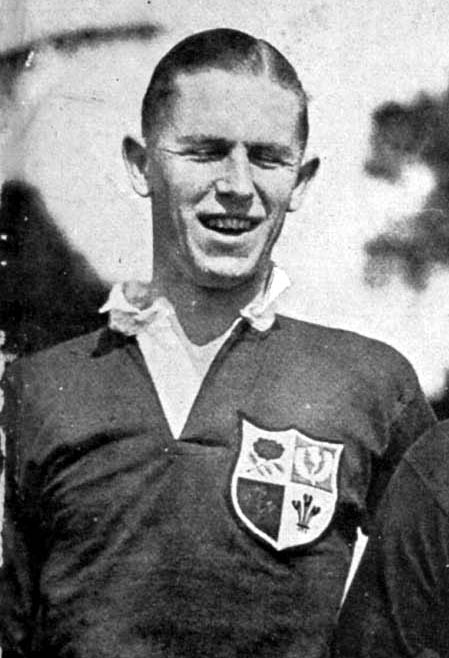
- Aarvold during a British and Irish Lions tour on Argentina, 1927

Recorder of London
- In office 1964–1975
- Preceded by: Sir Anthony Hawke
- Succeeded by: Sir James Miskin

Personal details
- Born: Carl Douglas Aarvold; 7 June 1907 Hartlepool, County Durham, England
- Died: 17 March 1991 (aged 83) Westhumble, Surrey, England
- Education: Durham School; Emmanuel College, Cambridge

Rugby union career
- Position: Centre
Senior career
Years	Team	Apps	(Points)
- Cambridge
- Headingley
- West Hartlepool
- Blackheath F.C.
International career
Years	Team	Apps	(Points)
1928-1933	England	16	(12)
1927-1930	British Isles	5	(9)

Sir Carl Douglas Aarvold OBE TD (7 June 1907 – 17 March 1991) was an English barrister who became Recorder of London. Among other cases, he presided at the 1965 trial of the Kray twins. In his earlier days, he was also an England rugby union international player.

== Biography ==
Born in Hartlepool, he was educated at Durham School and Emmanuel College, Cambridge and from 1928 until 1933 played rugby 16 times for his country, captaining the side six times. He was called to the bar in 1932. Two years later he married Noeline Hill at St George's, Hanover Square, and the marriage yielded three sons.

His professional career was interrupted by World War II during which he served in the Royal Artillery and reached the temporary rank of lieutenant-colonel. He was appointed Officer of the Order of the British Empire (OBE) in 1945 for his war service and also received the Territorial Decoration

Embarking on a legal career, he was by 1951 the Recorder of Pontefract and then Judge of the Lord Mayor's and City of London Court (later Common Serjeant). By now Master of the Inner Temple he succeeded Edward Anthony Hawke to be Recorder of London, the Senior Judge at The Old Bailey in 1964, and was knighted in 1968. A long-serving president of the Lawn Tennis Association, he died on 17 March 1991; his wife died in 2005.

In 1966, he received the Grand Decoration of Honour in Silver for Services to the Republic of Austria.
