= Hugh John Beazley =

Royal Air Force officer

Hugh John Sherard Beazley
- Born: 18 July 1916
- Died: 13 June 2011 (aged 94); Cornwall, England
- Military career
- Allegiance: United Kingdom
- Branch: Royal Air Force
- Service years: 1939–1946
- Rank: Wing Commander
- Nickname: Beazle
- Unit: No. 89 Squadron RAF
- Commands: No. 249 Squadron RAF
- Conflicts: Second World War
- Awards: Distinguished Flying Cross
- Other work: Colonial Office

Wing Commander Hugh John Sherard "Beazle" Beazley, DFC (18 July 1916 – 13 June 2011) was a Royal Air Force fighter pilot during the Second World War.

== Early life ==
Hugh John Sherard Beazley was born on 18 July 1916, the son of a judge Sir Hugh Loveday Beazley. He was educated at Cheltenham College and Pembroke College, Oxford, where he read History. While at university he began flying with the Oxford University Air Squadron, and played rugby for Richmond.

== Second World War ==
On the outbreak of the Second World War, Beazley, a member of the Royal Air Force Volunteer Reserve since December 1937, was called up to serve in the Royal Air Force and completed his training as a pilot at Royal Air Force College Cranwell. He was then posted to No. 249 Squadron at Church Fenton on its formation in May 1940. Based at Leconfield, it trained on Hawker Hurricane fighters and became operational in July.

On 8 July Beazley shared in the destruction of a German bomber over Yorkshire. The squadron moved to Boscombe Down the following month and immediately became engaged in the aerial fighting over the southeast of England.

=== Battle of Britain ===
On 2 September Beazely probably destroyed a Messerschmitt Bf 109 fighter but was attacked in turn; his Hurricane burst into flames. Beazley bailed out and landed safely near Gillingham – despite being fired on by the local artillery battery. He was soon back in action, and four days later shared in the destruction of another enemy fighter. On 15 September, now known as Battle of Britain Day, he accounted for a Dornier Do 17 and two days later he shared in the destruction of a Junkers Ju 88. By this time the squadron was operating from RAF North Weald.

Beazley was promoted to the rank of flying officer on 25 September. Two days later, while attacking a Messerschmitt Bf 110 heavy fighter, he was badly wounded in the foot but managed to nurse his aircraft back to the airfield at North Weald. He was subsequently hospitalised and therefore it was his last action during the Battle of Britain.

=== Malta ===
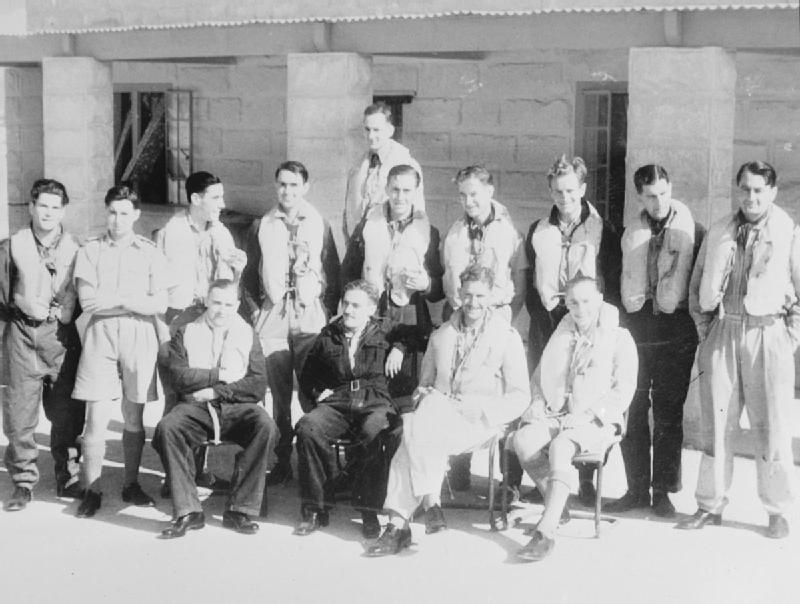
Beazley sits front left in this group of No. 249 Squadron pilots at Ta Kali, 1941

After being wounded in action, Beazley spent five months in hospital before rejoining the squadron in March 1941 in time to sail for Malta on the carrier HMS Ark Royal. Beazley, along with the rest of the squadron, was launched from the ship on 21 May 1941, arriving at Ta Kali in Malta. He was promoted again to the rank of flight lieutenant on 25 September.

Beazley damaged an Italian bomber, a Messerschmitt Bf 109 and, on an intruder mission over Sicily, destroyed a train. On 19 January 1942 his Hurricane was hit by ground fire during an attack on the Italian airfield at Comiso and he was forced to crash land on his return to Malta. In February 1942 he probably destroyed a German Junkers Ju 88. After the loss of the squadron commander in December, Beazley was made No. 249 Squadron's commanding officer but, in February 1942, after 10 months of continuous action and 215 combat sorties during the Battle of Britain and over Malta, he was rested.

=== Later war service ===
After serving on Air Marshal Arthur Tedder's staff, Beazley returned to operations in December 1942, flying the twin-engined Beaufighter. He was posted to No. 89 Squadron RAF in North Africa before, in October 1943, travelling with it to join the fighting in South East Asia. In March 1944 he was awarded a Distinguished Flying Cross for "displaying the highest standard of courage and leadership" and appointed to command the operational airfield at Minneriya in Ceylon. He was promoted squadron leader on 13 June 1944.

In the final stages of the war Beazley was offered further promotion, but since this meant he would have to stop flying, he transferred to Transport Command and flew Dakotas with No. 246 Squadron RAF in Europe, the Middle and Far East until 1946, when he left the RAF. He officially relinquished his commission on 23 August 1954.

== Later life ==
After leaving the RAF, Beazley joined the Colonial Office and was posted to Nigeria, where he worked for 10 years, rising to become a Senior Resident. He loved Nigeria and its people and remained lifelong friends with his Nigerian colleague, Simeon Adebo – later United Nations Under-Secretary General. After Nigeria was granted independence, Beazley became a chartered accountant and joined the BET group, where he worked as a finance director until his retirement in 1981.

In Hertfordshire Beazley was an important supporter of the Conservative Party, serving as a councillor and then as chairman of Hoddesdon district council. He was also president of the Broxbourne Conservative Association.

Beazley was a trustee and treasurer of the Battle of Britain Memorial Trust, playing a major role in establishing a permanent memorial to "The Few" at Capel-Le-Ferne.

In 1947 Beazley married Mary Rawlings, daughter of Admiral Sir Bernard Rawlings. Beazley died on 13 June 2011 and was survived by his wife, their two sons and one daughter.
