= Roger Spong =

England rugby union footballer (1906–1980)

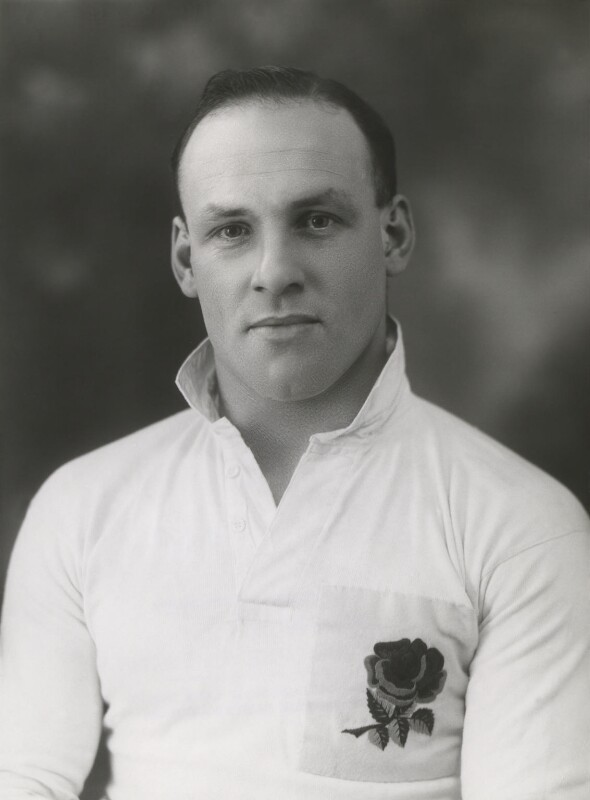
- Spong in 1931
- Born: Roger Spencer Spong; 23 October 1906 Barnet, England
- Died: 27 March 1980 (aged 73) (registered in) SW Surrey
- School: Mill Hill School

Rugby union career
- Position: Fly-half
International career
Years	Team	Apps	(Points)
1929-1932	England	7	
1927-1930	Great Britain	9	

Roger Spong (23 October 1906 – 27 March 1980) was a rugby union international who represented England from 1929 to 1932.

== Early life ==
Roger Spong was born on 23 October 1906 in Barnet into the family that had founded and ran Spong and Co. Spong and Co had been founded by Roger's grandfather, James Osborn Spong (born in 1839 in Yardley Hastings, Northampton) the eldest son, and one of six children of, James Spong, originally of Kent, a minister, and his wife, Elizabeth Osborn. In 1856, when he was just 16, James Osborn founded Spong and Co, a company manufacturing hardware and wirework, making economic household utensils, or as they were then called, 'domestic machinery'. The company became a household name and in 1882 was boasting sales of 200,000 mincers as well as being able to advertise that their mincing machine was owned by 'Her Most Gracious Queen Victoria', the Admiralty and the War Office, and could be found in the mansions of the nobility, the mess-rooms of the army and navy at home and abroad, also in the universities, colleges and many other great institutions of England.

James and his wife Frances Elizabeth Scott had a number of children, including suffragettes Dora Spong and her sisters. The eldest Spong child was Roger's father, James William, (born in 1868). Like his father, James William was educated at Mill Hill School and in 1902 he joined his father's company. Shortly after joining the company, James William married Alice Spencer and they had Donald William in 1904 and Roger Spencer in 1906.

== Career ==
In 1935, Spong became a director of Spong and Co, following his brother who had become a director in 1932. Donald and Roger becoming joint managing directors in 1944, with the company still a leader in the production of kitchen utensils such as, mincers, slicers, shredders, graters, coffee mills, baking tins and various metallic and plastic scourers.

In 1955 Spong's son, Christopher, had joined the company. In 1960 Spong and Co became a Public Company, and in 1962 had moved to Crompton Close, Basildon, Essex. Christopher saw the company through a number of changes including the 1980 sell off of the hardware section of the company to Salter Housewares Ltd, and the change of name of Spong Holdings plc, to Lion Heart plc and then to Brit Nit which itself was eventually sold to Cafetiere Household Articles.

Christopher's sons, Nicholas and Simon Spong also went to Mill Hill School and excelled at sport, especially rugby. They both now have successful careers but outside sport.

== Rugby union career ==
Spong made his international debut on 1 April 1929 at Colombes in the France vs England match. Of the 13 matches he played for his national side he was on the winning side on 4 occasions.

He played his final match for England on 16 January 1932 at St Helen's, Swansea in the Wales vs England match.
