= Brooke Kinsella =

British actress

Brooke Kinsella MBE
- Born: Brooke Michelle Moore; 17 July 1983 (age 43); London, England
- Education: Maria Fidelis RC Convent School
- Occupation: Actress
- Years active: 1994–present
- Television: EastEnders; No Child of Mine; Mud; Vital Signs
- Spouse: Simon Boardley (m. 2017)
- Children: 2
- Relatives: Ben Kinsella (half-brother, deceased)
- Website: instagram.com/brookekinsella

Brooke Kinsella (born 17 July 1983) is a British actress. A graduate of the Anna Scher Theatre School, Kinsella has been acting since childhood. She has had various roles on television and in film. Her most notable role is that of Kelly Taylor, who featured in the BBC's long-running soap opera EastEnders between 2001 and 2004. She has her own drama school called True Stars Academy.

Kinsella's family made headlines in the British press in 2008 following the murder of her half-brother, Ben, who was stabbed to death in June of that year. After his death, hundreds of people protested alongside Kinsella over knife fatalities in London.

== Career ==
Kinsella attended the Maria Fidelis RC Convent School in Camden. Prompted by her mother, who wanted to encourage her to take up a hobby she enjoyed, Kinsella attended the Anna Scher Theatre School at the age of 6, and stayed there until she was 16.

She made her television debut at the age of 7 in the BBC children's series Mud and has appeared in a variety of other TV productions, including Coming Home. As well as appearing in an episode of the BBC series Sunburn in 2000, she has also appeared in the entirely unrelated music video "Sunburn" by British rock band Muse.

Film credits include the Channel 4 film Kid In The Corner (1999), about a child with ADHD, and the controversial ITV film No Child of Mine (1997), in which she played a young girl subjected to systematic sexual abuse.

In 2002, Kinsella appeared in ITV1's cop showThe Bill, portraying troubled teenager Liz Chambers. Her character later became the first victim of the original Sun Hill Serial Killer, in the biggest storyline in the show, since the Sun Hill Fire.

Her stage credits include School Play at Soho Theatre (2001) and a rehearsed reading of Skyvers by Barry Reckord at the Royal Court Theatre in 2006.

Before securing the role of Kelly Taylor in EastEnders, Kinsella had auditioned for the parts of Zoe Slater, Janine Butcher and Sonia Jackson, but was unsuccessful. Kinsella completed the first year of a degree in English, Media and Drama at Buckinghamshire New University before joining the cast of EastEnders. She joined the show for a brief stint in 2001, before returning as a full-time cast member from 2002 to 2004. During her time on the soap opera, Brooke's character weathered prostitution, relationship break-ups and confusion over her sexual identity prompted by a lesbian kiss with Michelle Ryan's character, Zoe Slater. The kiss was criticised in the British media as cheap sensationalism and branded as a ratings-stunt. Louise Berridge, the one-time executive producer of EastEnders, made the decision to axe Kinsella's character in 2004 to allow further character development of her on-screen best friend, Zoe Slater; however, Kinsella maintains it was a mutual decision between herself and Berridge. In March 2008, Brooke said in an interview with Woman magazine that she would love to return to EastEnders at some point. In 2018, she helped the writers of EastEnders with a stabbing storyline involving the characters Shakil Kazemi and Keegan Taylor.

Kinsella and her real-life partner Ray Panthaki (who played Ronny Ferreira in EastEnders) played a heroin-taking couple in director Andrew Jones's film The Feral Generation, which was shot during the period of December 2006 and January 2007 and premiered at the 2007 Portobello Film Festival. Her debut novel, Friendship Is A Funny Thing, is awaiting publication. She was made an MBE for her work on knife crime in the Queen's Birthday Honours 2011.

== Personal life ==
Kinsella's father left the family when she was four years old and she was subsequently raised by her mother Debbie and stepfather George, whom Kinsella has described as her "real dad". She lives in Islington, north London, and is the eldest of five children; she has two sisters, a half-sister and had a half-brother.

Kinsella married her long-term partner Simon Boardley on 28 December 2017. On 22 September 2020, Kinsella gave birth to their first child, a daughter. On 29 June 2022, Kinsella gave birth to their second child, a boy.

=== Murder of brother ===
On 29 June 2008 at 02:00 BST, Kinsella's 16-year-old brother, Ben Kinsella, was stabbed to death by a gang of three youths in a London street. Ben, the seventeenth teenager killed in London in 2008, died in hospital a few hours later. Kinsella said she was "devastated".

Following his death, Kinsella and her family led hundreds of people in a march to protest against London's knife and gun crime. On 3 July 2008, three people were charged with Ben's murder, for which they were later tried and convicted. The Kinsella family launched the Ben Kinsella Trust in Ben's memory, in a bid to end knife crime. In the run up to the 2010 general election, Kinsella announced her support for the Conservative Party and revealed she would head a panel deciding how grants were distributed to voluntary groups tackling youth crime.

On 23 and 25 February 2011, an anti-knife campaign, funded by the Kinsella trust, was run in Birmingham's New Street Station, in conjunction with the British Transport Police and Great Barr School's drama department from its Sixth Form centre. A play was performed to the public throughout each of these days in the station's concourse, to raise awareness of the effects of knife crime.

Kinsella was appointed Member of the Order of the British Empire (MBE) in the 2011 Birthday Honours for services to the prevention of knife crime.

In December 2018, Kinsella appeared in an episode of the BBC One series Defenders UK to talk about the murder of her brother.

== Filmography ==
=== Films ===
Year	Film	Role	Notes
2011	London Town	Kate	
2007	The Feral Generation	Nikki	
2001	Just Like My Dad	Unknown Role	
1998	Candy	Sandra	

=== Television ===
Year	TV Show	Role	Notes
2018	Defenders UK	Herself	Series 1, Episode 15
2011	Law & Order: UK	Tina	Episode: Tick Tock
2011	Holby City	Emma Kerrigan	Episode: Too Much Monkey Business
2009–2011	Loose Women	Herself	2 episodes
2010	Missing	Leanne Hallam	Series 2, Episode 1
2009	The Wright Stuff	Herself – Guest Panelist	1 episode
2009	My Brother Ben: Brooke Kinsella's Story	Herself – Narrator	
2006	Vital Signs	Mandy	Series 1, Episodes 1, 2 and 5
2005	Jericho	Dawn Masters	Episode: A Pair of Ragged Claws
2005	Rose and Maloney	Lola Shore	Series 2, Episode 1
2005	EastEnders Revealed The Growing Pains of Zoe Slater	Herself	
2001–2004	EastEnders	Kelly Taylor	Series Regular
2004	Big Brother's Big Mouth	Herself – Guest Panelist	Series 1, Episode 18
2004	Big Brother's Little Brother	Herself	Series 4, Episode 10
2004	This Morning	Herself	1 episode
2003	EastEnders: Christmas Party	Herself	
2002	The Bill	Liz Chambers	Episodes 023 and 024
2002	NCS: Manhunt	Pauline Kowatowski	Series 1, Episode 1
2001	The Vice	Inez	Episode: Into the Night
2000	Killers	Unknown Role	
2000	Sunburn	Sally Prince	Series 2, Episode 6
1999	Kid in the Corner	Lucy Letts	Mini-series, Episodes 1, 2 and 3
1999	Hope and Glory	Marina	Series 1, Episodes 1, 3 and 4
1998	Maisie Raine	Sarah	Episode: Happy Families
1998	Coming Home	Jess	
1997	Original Sin	Daisy Reed	3 episodes : Series 1, Episodes 1, 2 and 3
1997	No Child of Mine	Kerry	
1996	Jack and Jeremy's Real Lives	Unknown Role	Episode: Consumer Watchdogs
1996	No Bananas	Janet	Episodes: Escape, Sitzkreig and Christmas
1994–1995	Mud	Ruby	Series 1, Episodes 1-6 Series 2 Episode 2
