= Boiling point (disambiguation) =

The boiling point of a substance is the temperature at which it can change its state from a liquid to a gas.

Boiling point may also refer to:

== Film and TV ==
- Boiling Point (1990 film), a Japanese film by Takeshi Kitano
- Boiling Point (1993 film), an American action film starring Wesley Snipes and Dennis Hopper
- Boiling Points, a television series broadcast by MTV in the United States
- Boiling Point (miniseries), a 1999 miniseries about celebrity chef Gordon Ramsay
- Boiling Point (2019 short film), a British short film starring Stephen Graham
- Boiling Point (2021 TV series), an American documentary series that aired on BET
- Boiling Point (2021 film), a British film starring Stephen Graham
- Boiling Point (2023 TV series), a British television series that follows the 2021 film
- "Boiling Point" (Casualty), an episode of the BBC TV series Casualty
- Ice Age: Boiling Point, upcoming 2027 film in the Ice Age franchise

== Other ==
- Boiling Point, California, an unincorporated community in the Mojave Desert
- Boiling Point (EP), a 2012 EP by Tech N9ne
- Boiling Point: Road to Hell, a 2005 PC video game developed by Deep Shadow, previously known as Xenus
- "Boiling Point", a song by Obituary from the 1994 album World Demise
- Boiling Point (2012), a professional wrestling event
