= Murder of Ben Kinsella =

2008 murder in London, England

Ben Kinsella
- Born: 27 October 1991; Islington, London, England
- Died: 29 June 2008 (aged 16); Islington, London, England
- Cause of death: Stab wounds
- Resting place: St Pancras and Islington Cemetery
- Education: 10 GCSEs
- Known for: Murder victim
- Parent(s): George and Deborah Kinsella
- Relatives: Brooke Kinsella (sister)

Ben Michael Kinsella (27 October 1991 – 29 June 2008) was a 16-year-old student at Holloway School who was stabbed to death in an attack by three men in June 2008 in Islington. The significant media attention around his murder (the 17th stabbing death of a teenager in London during 2008, and his relationship to a prominent soap star) led to a series of demonstrations against knife crime, a raised profile for the government's anti-knife crime maxim "Operation Blunt 2" and a review of UK knife crime sentencing laws.

== Life ==
Kinsella was born to cab driver George Kinsella and his wife Deborah, a school secretary. He had a brother and four sisters. Like his older sister Brooke Kinsella, who played Kelly Taylor in the BBC soap opera EastEnders from 2001 to 2004, Kinsella had been involved in acting and he had a bit part as Tyrone Dooley in a 2004 episode of The Bill. He was a popular and academically gifted student. Friends spoke of his caring and comical nature, adding he was "full of energy" and that he was "the life and soul of his class".

Before his death, Kinsella had become concerned about knife crime after being threatened whilst working part-time at Zebedee's Cafe in Islington, where he prevented the theft of a mountain bike. He wrote a letter to the Prime Minister Gordon Brown as part of his English GCSE coursework, urging him to stamp out knife crime and suggesting parenting classes, curfews and youth clubs as possible solutions. The letter was later forwarded to Brown by his family. He had also written a creative writing piece in which he imagined his own death from stabbing.

In August 2008, it was reported that he had passed all of his GCSEs, receiving two grade A*, three As, four Bs and one C.

As an aspiring graphic designer, Kinsella had also produced a design of the letter "K" that later became a symbol against knife violence and the logo of the Ben Kinsella Trust.

== Attack ==
On 28 June 2008, Kinsella was out celebrating the end of his GCSE exams with friends in Shillibeers Brasserie Bar (now called 'The Depot N7') near Caledonian Road tube station During this time, an altercation broke out between his friend Alfie and a man named Osman Ozdemir over the phrase "What are you looking at?" Having been separated by a door supervisor, a friend of Ozdemir, Jade Braithwaite, was heard saying phrases including "Tell your boy if he wants trouble, I've got my tool on me and it will open you up", "I'll stab people up", "If you want it, I'll give it to you" and "Don't you know who I am?". Braithwaite was also said to be frequently motioning to the inside of his jeans as if he had a weapon.

The altercation between Alfie and Ozdemir went outside the bar, where Ozdemir and another of Braithwaite's friends were allegedly glassed. Braithwaite and his friends subsequently fled the scene after being chased by Alfie and two other men, however Braithwaite then contacted Juress Kika and Michael Alleyne for back-up and then returned in a car with them to seek revenge on those he perceived to have disrespected him. Shortly before 02:00am on 29 June, Kinsella and his friends decided to return home. When they noticed they were being followed his friends began to run. Kinsella, however, did not; it is thought because he knew he had nothing to do with the earlier disturbance. He then crossed over the road in order to distance himself. He was then jointly cornered between two white vans by Braithwaite, Michael Alleyne and Juress Kika. As the three closed in on him he was heard pleading, "What are you coming over to me for? I haven't done anything."

Moments later, Kinsella was kicked and punched to the ground, receiving 11 stab wounds to the chest and back in a period witnesses testified to be only a five-second duration. Two wounds entered his lungs (causing his lung to collapse) and another inflicted with such force that it went straight through his third rib, splitting it, before entering the top of his heart. His pulmonary artery had also been punctured and some of his wounds were nearly seven inches (18 cm) deep. His hands also suffered stab wounds, indicating that he tried to fend off the knives. CCTV footage showed Kinsella stagger from the scene where he was supported by his friend Louis. Kinsella was pronounced dead at 07:24 as a result of blood loss from the numerous stab wounds.

== Demonstrations ==
After Kinsella's murder, an estimated 400 teenagers joined a demonstration to highlight concerns over the UK's growing knife crime culture. 16-year-old Brooke Dunford organised the event via Facebook; they marched from Islington Town Hall to the site of Kinsella's murder at the junction of North Road and York Way, passing by Shillibeers nightclub in silence. The crowd were heard chanting "What are we here for? Ben. Why are we here? No knives."

Kinsella's funeral was attended by around 1000 mourners including public figures such as Michelle Ryan, Gillian Taylforth and James Alexandrou.

The Kinsella family made numerous media appearances campaigning against knives and set up the Ben Kinsella Trust in memory of Ben to raise awareness of the effects of knife crime.

== Murderers ==
Left to right: Jade Braithwaite, Michael Alleyne, Juress Kika

The three men convicted of Kinsella's murder were alleged members of the Market Massiv' street gang, which was based about 100 meters from the Shillibeers Brasserie Bar in the Market Estate flat complex, and engaged in low-level drug dealing as well as arranging illegal dogfights. Alleyne was described as gang leader, with Braithwaite as his enforcer and Kika as a foot soldier. The trio were also feuding with another street gang from the Andover Estate in Holloway, who had pistol-whipped Alleyne during a previous confrontation over a verbal dispute.

=== Jade Darrell Braithwaite ===
Braithwaite of Bow, London, was aged 19 at the time of Kinsella's murder and 20 at the time of sentencing. With a height of 6'6", Braithwaite had hoped to become a professional goalkeeper and played in an Islington youth league until its closure when he was 14. He had also worked as a coach at a local leisure centre. Prior to the murder, Braithwaite had a reprimand for possession of cannabis and was convicted of attempted theft of a laptop computer from a fellow teenager. He was given a one-year detention and training order in 2006 but during 2007 his sentence was cut on appeal to community service.

=== Michael Leroy Alleyne ===
Alleyne, of Islington, London, was aged 18 both at the time of Kinsella's murder and at the time of sentencing. He had been released three months earlier from a young offender institution and was under the supervision of the council's youth offending team at the time of the murder. Alleyne had a criminal record including shoplifting, robbery, motor vehicle theft and drug dealing of crack cocaine and heroin. Alleyne's electronic tag was removed just weeks prior to the attack. He had also previously been in custody for robbery of a mobile phone. He was also known to "terrorise" council estate tenants with his two Staffordshire Bull Terriers. Alleyne is also alleged to have pulled a gun on a young member of his own gang.

=== Juress Kika ===
Kika of Islington, London, was aged 18 at the time of Kinsella's murder and 19 at the time of sentencing, by which time he had become a father. He was the son of a minicab driver and was mostly raised by his mother. He was first cautioned aged 11; the same year he stabbed 14-year-old Robert Parker in the back with a 3-inch blade before calmly walking away, although he was not prosecuted because of his age. Kika was on the run from police for a stabbing and robbery incident over a drugs argument nine days prior to the murder. He had also received convictions for robbery, affray, and obstructing a constable.

== Evidence ==
The prosecution amassed a large amount of evidence that was used during the 7-week trial.

=== Witnesses, forensics and apprehension ===
All three defendants were witnessed running together at Kinsella prior to the murder and later standing together shortly afterwards. Alleyne and Kika were then seen going to Alleyne's father's flat. This flat was raided by police shortly afterwards, but Alleyne and Kika had already walked through a police cordon and fled to Alleyne's cousin's flat in Chadwell Heath where they were apprehended after running along rooftops.

Alleyne's father had originally indicated that Alleyne and Kika returned to the flat around 2:30 a.m., but changed his statement six months later, claiming it was confused due to an injury he received during the raid itself. When giving testimony, Alleyne's father admitted that his son had said to him, "If it hadn't been for you, I wouldn't be in this mess". Several of Kinsella's friends also testified about Braithwaite's activities in Shillibeers nightclub. Alleyne's cousin Kellie later claimed that Alleyne and Kika had confessed the murder to her.

The police never found the murder weapon or weapons involved. However, 72 spots of Kinsella's blood were later identified on a pair of Alleyne's jeans that he handed to his sister to dispose of, and traces were also found on Kika's belt. No forensic evidence was found in relation to Braithwaite; however, police found some of his clothes had been washed in bleach.

After handing himself in to the police, Braithwaite first claimed that he did not know either Alleyne or Kika. Later he claimed he had seen Alleyne stab Kinsella but he had not been involved himself. He stated that Alleyne had a reputation for using weapons and was concerned about the impact that telling the police would have upon his family. Both Alleyne and Kika answered "no comment" to all questions asked during their police interviews.

=== Letter from Alleyne to Kellie ===
Aware that his cousin Kellie was going to give evidence against him, Alleyne wrote a threatening letter to her from jail, reading:

To Slag a.k.a. snitch, You are a let down to the family. You are not my cousin, believe that. How are you gonna give my letters to boydem and be snitching on me? You are not real at all. When will I see you? Your mum's still on road, so be careful how you move. You don't know how I move on road. I'm a boss. People in the North no [sic] who I am. Fuck that. When the shit hits the fan, you snitch.

I don't know who the fuck you are, you don't try to keep me out of jail. I'm a real nigga and you ask your dad about me, he's seen things. You all best hope I don't bust case because people will be in trouble and you will never snitch on anyone again, I promise you that.

Say no more, I am ghost. I ain't got time to rite [sic] to snitches, family that's not real. I got your statements, everyone will know that Kellie is a snitch. You see, snitches get touched.

You see blood, Tottenham ride or die. All the family knows you are a snitch so if I get found guilty it's down to you.

— Michael Alleyne

This letter subsequently became a major part of the Crown's case against Alleyne.

=== Covert tape ===
Police obtained a licence to record Braithwaite, Alleyne and Kika in the back of a police van, where they were able to establish that the three knew each other.

Braithwaite is heard on the tape trying to bribe the others to say he was not there and also revealed on the tape that the Clerkenwell crime syndicate, better known as the Adams family, had made threats against Kinsella's murderers, indicating that each was a "marked man". Braithwaite was recorded saying that the Adams family "have got big money down on whoever was involved... the Adams family's right-hand man wants to speak to me."

Kika was heard discussing getting a "teardrop" (alleged to be referring to a teardrop tattoo to mark him as having been involved in a murder) and discussing "fixing" the person who records the CCTV for the area. Kika is also heard saying "See when it happened yeah it was kinda like a quick ting [sic] like boom, went down the road, come back up, boom, finished. You get what I'm saying?" – apparently in relation to the murder itself.

Additionally, Alleyne was heard on the tape discussing disposing of evidence.

== Trial ==
On 13 October 2008 all three defendants pleaded not guilty to the charge of murder. A 7-week trial began at the Old Bailey on 27 April 2009. The judge was the Common Serjeant of London, Brian Barker QC. The Crown Prosecution Service was represented by Nicholas Hilliard QC and Duncan Penny. Braithwaite was represented by Orlando Pownall QC and Nerida Hartford-Bell. Alleyne was represented by Sallie Bennett-Jenkins QC and Z. Ahmed. Kika was represented by Diana Ellis QC and James Nichol.

During the course of the trial, both Braithwaite and Alleyne took the witness stand. Braithwaite claimed that Kinsella had thrown a punch at him, although there was no supporting evidence for this. After this, Braithwaite claimed he saw Alleyne carry out the murder. Braithwaite also claimed that a friend of Alleyne had punched him in the cells of the Old Bailey whilst he was handcuffed to a wall. Alleyne claimed that he had been contacted by Braithwaite and asked to back him following the dispute at Shillibeers, although no phone records identified a call between Braithwaite and Alleyne prior to the attack. Kika exercised his right to silence and did not take the witness stand.

== Verdict ==
Having retired to consider their verdict on 9 June, the jury returned on 11 June with a unanimous verdict of guilty in relation to all three defendants. The victim's mother, Deborah Kinsella, then read out a victim impact statement in court following the verdict.

== Sentencing ==
As a result of the murder of Westley Odger on 12 September 2005, his mother, Ann Oakes Odger, began a campaign to bring knife crime in line with gun crime. This resulted in a new 25-year knife murder tariff through the Schedule 21 Review of the Criminal Justice Act 2003 which was relevant to the sentencing in this case.

At the Old Bailey on 12 June 2009, Judge Brian Barker QC sentenced Braithwaite, Alleyne and Kika each to life imprisonment with a minimum term of 19 years. Passing sentence, the judge described the attack on Kinsella as "brutal, cowardly and totally unjustified", adding that "your blind and heartless anger that night defies belief." He continued, saying that there was "no possible excuse" for such an "arrogant and unfeeling attack on someone who had done nothing". He also condemned them for picking on "an obviously younger and smaller lone victim" and for their total lack of remorse.

The defendants were jeered at by members of the public in the public gallery. Kika and Alleyne gestured back at the gallery as if they were firing guns. Angry scenes also took place between the victim's and defendants' families after one of the accused's mothers spat on Kinsella's cousin Sam whilst shouting "I love you, baby." Another person connected to one of the accused attempted to kick one of Kinsella's friends in the head.

== Aftermath ==
After the trial, the Kinsella family called for stronger sentences for knife crimes. Kinsella's father was quoted as saying "If you murder someone with a gun, the starting tariff is 30 years. But if you do it with a knife, it's 15 years." The UK's Secretary of State for Justice, Jack Straw agreed to carry out a review of knife crime sentencing laws shortly afterwards. The Kinsella family said that to them, "life should mean life," although it is not possible in English law to give a whole life tariff to murderers under the age of 21. A review of the sentencing by the Attorney General for England and Wales, Baroness Scotland determined that the sentencing would not be referred to the Court of Appeal as "unduly lenient".

A 50 minute documentary titled My Brother Ben: Brooke Kinsella's Story was aired on BBC One on 16 June 2009. It followed Brooke Kinsella's investigation of the underlying causes of knife crime during the period from her brother's death to the end of the court case. Brooke also travelled to New York to see prisons using short, sharp shock treatments to rehabilitate young offenders. The documentary also points out the success of Operation Blunt 2, which carried out over 290,000 stop and searches, leading to over 10,000 arrests and the confiscation of over 5,500 knives within the timeline of the documentary.

A book by Brooke Kinsella, entitled Why Ben?: A Sister's Story of Heartbreak and Love for the Brother She Lost was released on 3 September 2009.

== Appeal ==
On 28 June 2009, it was reported that all three killers were set to appeal against their sentences stating the tariff was "too harsh". They claimed the publicity surrounding the case was a factor in their sentences. On 13 November 2009, Juress Kika lost his appeal to challenge his 19 year sentence. He argued his sentence was "manifestly excessive"; however, the Lord Judge (Baron Judge), Mr Justice Penry-Davey and Mr Justice Henriques rejected this statement saying that the term could not "remotely" be described as excessive. They concluded that "there is no true mitigation. There was no guilty plea, no remorse, and no insight into the devastation that had been caused". They accepted that the applicant was young when the murder was committed but added that Kika "knew exactly what he was doing. They all did. They were all equally involved. They all intended to kill the young victim. They had hunted him down and mercilessly done him to death to revenge an insignificant slight for which he bore no responsibility whatsoever."

== Change in sentencing law ==
After agreeing on request by the Kinsella family and due to the public outrage surrounding the case, Justice Secretary Jack Straw announced the minimum tariff for murders committed with a knife would rise from 15 to 25 years, and this happened in 2010. This new development was being called "Ben's Law" and Ben's father George hoped that the new law would act as a deterrent to anyone thinking of carrying a knife.
