= Keri Collins =

Welsh director and screenwriter

Keri Collins backstage at BAFTA Cymru Awards 2014

Keri Collins (born 1978) is a BAFTA winning director and writer for film and television. He has written and directed for the BBC, Sky TV, Netflix, The Sunday Times and PBS.

Collins was born in Pontypool, Wales. He was selected for the prestigious Guiding Lights scheme in 2008 and, as a result, was mentored by Sir Kenneth Branagh.

Collins' short film Funday was an official selection at the Raindance Film Festival 2011. It was acquired for distribution by Shorts International, nominated for a BAFTA Cymru award for Best Short film and described by Tony Grisoni (Fear and Loathing in Las Vegas) as "deliciously melancholic".

His debut feature comedy, the Raindance 2013 official selection, Convenience starred Vicky McClure (This is England), Ray Panthaki (Ali G In da House), Adeel Akhtar (Four Lions) and Verne Troyer (Austin Powers). It received multiple four star reviews, including from Empire magazine and won the Breakthrough Award at the 2014 BAFTA Cymru Awards.

In 2018, Collins directed Tourist Trap, a BBC One Wales comedy series set in a fictional version of the Welsh tourist board. The show stars Sally Phillips and has run for two series and two specials. He directed the second and third series of Soft Border Patrol for BBC Northern Ireland and four episodes of Trollied for Sky One.

In 2024, Collins was named as a Writer to Watch by Deadline, following the news that he was writing a family movie adaptation of the 1980s series Super Gran for Brock Media. The script topped The Brit List 2023, with the highest number of votes ever received for a project on the list in its 15 year history.
