= No Child of Mine =

1997 British docudrama television film

- Title card
- Directed by: Peter Kosminsky
- Written by: Guy Hibbert
- Produced by: Peter Kosminsky
- Starring: Brooke Kinsella; Colin Salmon; Billy Geraghty; Sharon Small; Geoffrey Church; Ginny Holder
- Cinematography: Mike Shrimpton
- Edited by: Chris Ridsdale
- Production companies: Meridian Broadcasting; Stonehenge Films; United Film and Television Productions
- Release date: 25 February 1997
- Running time: 83 minutes
- Country: United Kingdom
- Language: English

No Child of Mine is a 1997 British docudrama-television film on ITV starring Brooke Kinsella. It documents the true case of a girl named Kerry who was sexually abused throughout her childhood. It premiered on 25 February 1997 in the United Kingdom.

== Plot ==
Ten-year-old Kerry, whose last name is not disclosed for safety reasons, endures problems at home with her parents fighting each other and eventually separating. Shortly after, her mother's new boyfriend, Graham, moves in with them and begins physically and sexually abusing her. Her mother, Linda, also occasionally takes part in the abuse, making her daughter perform oral sex on her. Kerry's father, Jim, a construction worker, attempts to manipulate her into prostitution, something she is unaware of until a few truck drivers "borrow" her.

Kerry's situation worsens at home and she decides to run away after Jim attacks Linda and Graham for abusing Kerry. One of her class teachers, Paul suddenly becomes aware of her situation and attempts to have her placed in childcare. The class teacher, social workers, and friends attempt to file charges of sexual and physical abuse on Kerry's behalf against her mother's boyfriend. However, the Crown Prosecution Service later declines to continue the case, arguing there is not enough legal evidence to support the allegations. Kerry is placed into foster care, but struggles to settle in and repeatedly destroys property, making it impossible for the foster family to keep her.

Kerry is then placed into a care home. She is seduced by a pimp named Mick (who knows exactly how Kerry feels about living with an abusive mother and stepfather like hers who don't understand her), and for some time willingly leases herself for profit. A social worker called Chris in the childcare home also begins to sexually abuse her. Feeling helpless and increasingly hopeless, Kerry frequently visits her class teacher and tries to move in with him, but he is unable to care for her. He consults his friend and child-support agent to have Kerry placed somewhere safe, but her case cannot be given any more priority than that of any other child.

Towards the end of the film, Kerry runs away and finds a small and peaceful care home in a rural location. They decline her offer of money, which she obtained by prostituting herself. Profoundly traumatized, Kerry does not speak for the first five days there. Twelve days later, as she begins to trust the people in the home, Kerry emotionally breaks down and reveals her horrific abuse history to the woman running the safe house. It's reported that her abusers did not suffer any legal consequences and speaks of the abysmal conviction rate of child sexual abuse in the UK, and that Kerry obtained her GCSE and went on to study at university.

== Cast ==
- Brooke Kinsella as Kerry
- Colin Salmon as Paul
- Bill Geraghty as Jim
- Sharon Small as Linda
- Geoffrey Church as Graham
- Ginny Holder as Bridget
- Darren Tighe as Mick
- Kate Byers as Matty
- Katie Lyons as Tracy
- Jill Marie Cooper as Lucy (as Jill Cooper)
- Billie Holmes as Paula
- Anna Waters as Donna
- Bridget Hodson as Miss Lewis
- Alex Knight as Steve
- Phil Herne as Shane
- Ravin J. Ganatra as Len
- Edward Highmore as Ray
- Karl Jenkinson as Derek
- Judy Norman as Vanessa
- James Powell as Peter
- Jason Hall as Mike
- Julie Smith as Carly
- Ralph Van Dijk as Male Doctor
- Melanie Ramsay as P.C. Kate Booth
- Lavinia Bertram as Female Doctor
- Nita Gale as Sally
- Jason Stracey as Vic
- Annie Hayes as Pam
- Natalie Ratcliff as Denise
- Barry McNicholl as Gary
- Kay Dacey as First Girl
- Diane Adderley as Childline Voice (voice)
- Colin Wyatt as Chris

== Production ==
The film was written by Guy Hibbert for Meridian Broadcasting/ITV. It was produced and directed by Peter Kosminsky.

== Reception ==
The show was criticised by the Association of Directors of Social Services, which claimed that the events of the show had not been corroborated by doctors nor by the police. Charities working with sexual abuse survivors, on the other hand, praised the show for speaking out about the issue. Producer Peter Kominsky said he had investigated "Kerry"'s story for two years before making the programme and had promised her that he would protect her identity.
