= Kelly Taylor (EastEnders) =

Fictional character from EastEnders

- EastEnders character
- Portrayed by: Brooke Kinsella
- Duration: 2001–2004
- First appearance: Episode 2217; 11 December 2001
- Last appearance: Episode 2748/2749; 18 June 2004
- Introduced by: John Yorke (2001); Louise Berridge (2002)
In-universe information
- Occupation: Prostitute; Market trader Holiday rep

Kelly Taylor is a fictional character from the BBC soap opera EastEnders, played by Brooke Kinsella. The character was introduced by executive producer John Yorke, in 2001. She was only due to appear in eight episodes as part of a prostitution/homelessness storyline featuring Michelle Ryan's established character, Zoe Slater, who had run away from home in late 2001 and was living at the same brothel as Kelly. However, the viewer response to Kelly was positive, so she was reintroduced as a regular at the end of 2002. The character remained in the serial until 2004, when executive producer Louise Berridge decided that her storylines had come to a natural end.

In March 2008, Kinsella said in an interview with Woman magazine that she would love to return to EastEnders at some point, but the ball is in the court of the producers.

== Character creation ==
The character Kelly Taylor was introduced in December 2001 by the executive producer, John Yorke. Kelly was introduced on a short-term basis as part of a storyline that saw the regular character, Zoe Slater (Michelle Ryan), living rough on the streets of London and being taken in by a madam of a prostitution organisation, Roxy Drake (Tracy Brabin). Kelly was one of the young girls already working as a prostitute for Roxy.

Actress Brooke Kinsella was cast in the role. In the past, Kinsella had auditioned for the parts of Janine Butcher, Zoe Slater and Sonia Fowler, but had been unsuccessful. Kinsella has commented, "I went up for the part of every girl in the Square. I was closest to getting the part of Zoe. I did workshops with all the Slater girls but you have to say they are all dark and look very alike while I'm blonde. Obviously that wasn't the right one for me. It was hard at the time but I'm very glad because I love playing Kelly. She's totally different from any other character and she's good fun to play."

The character was only brought in to appear in eight episodes, however the producers were impressed with Kinsella's performance and there was a positive reception from viewers, so she was asked to return to the role the following year. In the storyline, Kelly ran away from Roxy and she and Zoe went on an extended holiday to the Canary Islands. Kinsella has said that establishing Kelly as a regular character was a gradual process: "Kelly wasn't automatically made a regular and I kept thinking, 'It will be just a few more episodes'. It's a horrible feeling, not knowing if you have a job or not." By the end of 2002, Kelly and Zoe had returned to the serial, and Kelly's first big storyline was a brief romance with the character Spencer Moon (Christopher Parker). Kinsella has said, "That was the first on-screen kiss for both of us and that was the first time I thought there might be places for Kelly to go because it didn't involve Zoe. Kelly was interacting with other characters on [Albert Square]. It came bit by bit. She moved in with the Slaters, helped Zoe set up the stall and that's all slowly securing her on the Square."

== Development and reception ==
The friendship between Kelly and Zoe was a recurring storyline for both characters. In the British press, Kelly and Zoe were compared to two former popular characters, who also shared a close screen friendship, Bianca Butcher (Patsy Palmer) and Tiffany Mitchell (Martine McCutcheon). Kinsella has commented, "It is nice to be compared because they were great [characters] but, hopefully, [Michelle Ryan] and I will bring our own characters to light and show what we can do. We have so much in common and we balance each other out - when she's crazy I'll calm her down and vice-versa. It's worked well, which is why Kelly has been kept on, which is great for me but also for Michelle because she's got somebody to have fun with. Kelly's been one of the slowest developing characters and that's been good for me. I wasn't thrown into it and having Michelle has been great for me."

On-screen, the characters moved into a flat together, worked together, and fought over the same boys. In December 2003, EastEnders made headlines in the UK press, after they screened a lesbian kiss between Kelly and Zoe. The storyline was featured in a special New Year's Eve episode that was filmed on-location in Scotland. In the storyline, a group of teenagers had travelled from London to Scotland for New Year's Eve; however, the minibus they were driving crashed, leaving them stranded and injured on the freezing cold Scottish moors. While stranded, Kelly cared for an injured Zoe, they became overemotional, and kissed. Kinsella has explained the reasons behind the kiss: "They're stuck in the hills, thinking they're going to die - it's a way of saying goodbye and also of showing how much they love each other as friends. Which is quite sweet really." She claims that the lesbian kiss was made easier, due to the fact that she was kissing her off-screen best friend: "That made it so much easier. We thought we were just going to be laughing and giggling the whole way through, but we were very professional. It was so cold that we just wanted to get it over with. We were shaking from cold - not from nerves - and it was raining, so we just thought, 'Let's do it and get it done with'. I was really scared but it was fine. Now it just seems like a dream, I can't really remember it. We laugh about it now. When it came down to it, the truth was that it was just like any other screen kiss. The episode featuring the lesbian kiss attracted 9.5 million viewers, and the precise moment that they kissed was watched by 44% of the available viewing audience.

Kelly and Zoe, stranded on the Scottish Moors. Their lesbian kiss was criticised for being a "gratuitous ratings-stunt".

The kiss between the characters received criticism. The lesbian news site AfterEllen.com branded it a "gratuitous ratings-stunt…The writers bottled out and the two young women dismissed it as a one-off, assuring each other that neither of them was “like that,” leaving lesbian and bisexual viewers feeling cheated. This was a wasted opportunity, a chance to explore an emotionally complex situation between best friends that became just another exploitive TV moment instead." In an interview about homosexual television characters in The Guardian, scriptwriter Daran Little criticised UK lesbians in British soap: "Most lesbian characters are so lipstick. They start off straight and, lo and behold, they just can't resist it. You can see the straight fantasy at work behind the character". Journalist Paul Flynn stated that Zoe was an example of this, describing her as a "tabloid-friendly 18-year-old - who…brushed with lesbianism for all of five minutes."

Kinsella has defended the kiss. In an interview she commented, "It's not a gratuitous ratings getting move, it's not some kind of big lesbian kiss. It's the way two best friends who have a lot of love for each other show their emotions."

The character of Kelly was involved in numerous other storylines, which included prostitution, a drugs overdose, and various flings with characters such as Martin Fowler (James Alexandrou) and Ronny Ferreira (Ray Panthaki) - a relationship that ended when her past as a prostitute caught up with her. Later on, in 2004, the character began a romance with Spencer Moon (Christopher Parker). The two characters began their interaction at the end of 2002, with Spencer becoming infatuated with Kelly, while she teased and led him on. According to actress Brooke Kinsella, this was not well received by a proportion of viewers. In an interview in 2003 she commented, "It's been a really challenging time on the show. When Kelly first came along there was a really mixed reception to her from the public. A lot of girls didn't like her because she was flirting with Spencer and was also giving him the run-around. The girls can't stand the fact she's played around with him - all these 13-year-olds don't like their beloved Spencer being treated badly! It got quite bad - I just couldn't believe it. I didn't feel frightened but I was aware about just how much impact this show has on people. It's incredible how many viewers think the show is real." Later Kelly took Spencer's virginity as a birthday gift, but they did not become a legitimate couple until 2004.

In March 2004 it was announced that the character would be leaving the serial. A BBC spokesman said Brooke had "brought considerable talent and youthful energy to the show". Fans were assured that the character would not be killed off, and that "the door will be open for the character to re-join the show in the future". The character was axed by the executive producer of EastEnders Louise Berridge to allow further character development of her on-screen best friend, Zoe Slater. Berridge said: "[Kelly's] been a great addition to the show but her storyline had come to a natural ending." However, Kinsella has insisted that she was not axed, and her character's departure was a mutual decision between herself and Berridge, who both decided that Kelly had run out of storylines. In an interview she commented, "I honestly think my character, Kelly Taylor, came to a bit of a standstill. All she seemed to do was work on the market stall and give Zoe (Slater) advice and that got quite tedious. So it was the right time for her to leave … While there was a lot that hadn't been discovered about her, after the whole Kelly and Zoe kiss it didn't seem that there was anywhere to go. We did sit and discuss storylines but it didn't work out in the end … She's leaving to be a holiday rep. I'm very grateful Kelly doesn't get killed off and I'm sure if they can find the right storyline she'll return … The ending is very sweet and quite hopeful."

On-screen Kelly and her boyfriend Spencer applied to become holiday reps in Ibiza, however when Spencer's application was unsuccessful, Kelly left without him. The character made her final appearance in June 2004.

== Storylines ==
Kelly first appears on screen in December 2001. She is a young prostitute who is being pimped by the malicious Roxy Drake (Tracy Brabin). She had been thrown out by her family when she was a young girl and Roxy had taken her in off the streets. Kelly felt that she owed her and she had soon been persuaded to act as an underage prostitute for Roxy's clientele. Zoe Slater (Michelle Ryan), another runaway, has also been taken under Roxy's wing and she gives her a place to stay. Here, she meets and befriends Kelly, and on Roxy's instruction, Kelly sets about trying to convince Zoe to prostitute herself too. Zoe refuses to oblige, after which a furious Roxy starts demanding money from her in exchange for her hospitality. On Christmas Day that year, Kelly helps Zoe escape Roxy's evil clutches and Zoe returns to Albert Square, leaving Kelly to face up to a fuming Roxy.

Kelly is next seen in December 2002 when Zoe runs away from home for a second time, following her father's heart attack. She and Zoe decide to leave the United Kingdom and go to stay in Tenerife with one of Kelly's rich punters. Zoe returns to Walford and brings Kelly back with her. She takes up lodging with the rest of the Slaters and is soon welcomed in as part of the family. Now that she has given up prostitution, Kelly has no money, so Zoe decides that she should become a partner in her clothing stall, and the two run it together in Bridge Street market.

On New Year's Eve, Kelly sets her sights on the inexperienced Spencer Moon (Christopher Parker) and the two share a kiss. This leads Spencer to imagine that something more serious will happen between them, and he adorns Kelly with gifts and flowers in the hope that she will agree to date him. However, it is just a bit of fun for Kelly and she rebuffs all his further advances.

In order to buy into the stall, Kelly had stolen money from her ex-punter, Simon, and in January 2003 he shows up demanding that she pay him back. When she cannot repay him, he threatens her with the police, so Kelly cons Spencer into giving her money and also steals money from the stall to raise the funds. Zoe soon discovers that the money is missing, so Kelly blames Spencer and then flees. When the truth finally emerges, Zoe manages to talk Kelly out of leaving Walford and she quickly forgives her. Spencer decides to give up on Kelly after this, but on the night of his 18th birthday in April, Kelly decides to give him a night to remember by taking his virginity. Spencer is ecstatic, but his brother, Alfie (Shane Richie), manages to upset things by offering Kelly money to take Spencer out for a second date. Kelly wrongly assumes that Alfie knows about her past as a prostitute and furiously accuses Spencer of trying to buy her body, which puts a halt on their potential relationship.

Later in the year, Kelly and Zoe decide to move out of the Slaters' and share a flat on their own. At their flat warming party, Kelly gets friendly with new Walford arrival Ronny Ferreira (Ray Panthaki). This upsets Zoe because unbeknownst to Kelly, she has a crush on him and she proceeds to get drunk in The Queen Victoria public house one night and begins bad-mouthing Kelly to her mother Kat (Jessie Wallace), maliciously bringing up her past as a prostitute for all to hear. Ronny's best friend, Tariq Larousi (Nabil Elouahabi), overhears their conversation and he forces Zoe to inform Ronny about Kelly's past. Ronny is disgusted, and cruelly dumps Kelly, which leaves her devastated. Kelly is furious when she discovers that it was Zoe who had told him, and accuses her of doing it to get her hands on Ronny. After much arguing, Zoe eventually promises not to make a play for Ronny, as their friendship is more important. However, with Ronny now showing a keen interest in Zoe, she finds it difficult to shun his attention. A few weeks later at Martin Fowler (James Alexandrou)'s birthday party, Kelly decides to make a move on Martin to make Ronny jealous. Ronny isn't interested and only has eyes for Zoe. Kelly ends the night in bed with Martin, feeling hurt and rejected. Despite her past promise, Zoe starts to date Ronny, which causes major rows between the girls.

Later in the year, Kelly witnessed Ronny kissing another woman, but Zoe refused to believe her best friend, accused her of being jealous and threw her out of their flat. That night, a hurt Kelly decided to forget her woes and went clubbing in Angie's Den, only to collapse later after taking some dodgy ecstasy (which was provided by Tariq). Kelly's brush with death made Zoe realise how much she valued their friendship and she immediately dumped Ronny. Kelly was forced to remain quiet about Tariq providing her the drug, after he threatened to tell everyone about her sordid past unless she kept her mouth shut.

On New Year's Eve 2003, Kelly and Zoe go to Scotland for an all-night rave along with the other youths in Walford. Whilst on the way to their destination, disaster strikes when the mini bus they are driving crashes in the middle of the Scottish moors, leaving them stranded and injured. Zoe is hurt the most, and whilst the others all go in search of help, Kelly stays by the wreck with her injured friend to care for her. The weather is bitterly cold and the two huddle together to keep warm. A concerned Kelly relays to Zoe how happy she is to have her as a friend and how meeting her has changed her life. As the night wears on, Zoe begins to lose consciousness, and Kelly becomes frantic, fearing that Zoe is dying. Kelly becomes tearful and overemotional, as does Zoe, and in the heat of the moment, they kiss. The following day the stranded teenagers are rescued, but Zoe is reluctant to discuss the kiss with Kelly. Zoe spends a few days in hospital and upon her release, she becomes distant from Kelly, refusing to spend any time alone with her. Eventually, Kelly manages to get Zoe to talk and they both decide they aren't lesbians and that the kiss only happened because they believed they were going to die. Soon after, Zoe moves out of their flat as she can no longer afford the rent. Gus Smith (Mohammed George) comes to live there in her place, but the girls remain close friends and working partners.

Spencer and Kelly (2004).

In May 2004, Vicki Fowler (Scarlett Alice Johnson) decides to play match-maker and attempts to set Kelly and Spencer up on several dates. Each attempt fails miserably so she decides to lock them both in the office at Angie's Den, taking both their phones so they have to spend the night in there together. They initially start to argue. Kelly tells Spencer she only had sex with him a year earlier out of pity and Spencer insults Kelly about her sordid past. However, as the night wears on, the two began talking, and when Vicki finally comes to let them out, she is overjoyed to find them kissing.

The couple remain happy for a while and it seems that Spencer and Kelly are smitten with each other. During the summer, Kelly, Spencer and Kareena Ferreira (Pooja Shah) decide they want to become holiday reps in Ibiza. Kelly finds an article in a magazine promoting 'Red Hot Holiday' and the trio get ready for their interviews. Kelly and Kareena pass with flying colours, but Spencer doesn't so he is forced to stay behind while Kelly goes away. On the day of her departure, Kelly tells Spencer she loves him, which he reciprocates, and after a tearful farewell, Kelly promises she'll be back after the summer.

Spencer waits for Kelly to return, but by the end of the summer, Kareena returns and there is no sign of Kelly. Eventually, Kareena tells Spencer that she'd met another man and is not coming back. Kelly's last appearance is in June 2004. When Zoe leaves Walford in 2005, she goes to Spain to join Kelly.
