= Zoe Slater =

- EastEnders character
- Michelle Ryan as Zoe Slater (2025)
- Portrayed by: Michelle Ryan (2000–2026); Effie Mander (2025 flashback)
- Duration: 2000–2005, 2025–2026
- First appearance: Episode 2003; 18 September 2000
- Last appearance: Episode 7399; 14 September 2026
- Created by: Tony Jordan
- Introduced by: John Yorke (2000); Ben Wadey (2025)
- Spin-off appearances: Slaters in Detention (2003); Comic Relief 2003: The Big Hair Do (2003)
In-universe information
- Occupation: Market trader; Barmaid; Holiday rep
- Family: Slater
- Father: Harry Slater
- Mother: Kat Slater
- Adoptive father: Charlie Slater
- Adoptive mother: Viv Slater
- Stepfather: Alfie Moon
- Brothers: Dermott Dolan
- Half-brothers: Tommy Moon; Bert Moon; Ernie Moon
- Sons: Josh Goodwin
- Daughters: Jasmine Fisher
- Uncles: Charlie Slater
- Aunts: Lynne Hobbs; Belinda Peacock; Little Mo Mitchell
- First cousins: Freddie Slater
- Other relatives: Mo Harris; Stacey Slater; Lily Slater

Zoe Slater is a fictional character from the BBC soap opera EastEnders, portrayed by Michelle Ryan. She made her first appearance on 18 September 2000. In January 2005, it was announced that Ryan would be leaving the soap, departing on 24 June 2005. In May 2025, it was reported that Ryan would reprise the role, making an unannounced return on 16 June 2025 before returning full-time on 1 September. In July 2026, it was announced Ryan would again depart the role later that year. The character was killed off in the episode broadcast on 10 September 2026.

Zoe arrives in Walford along with her father, Charlie Slater (Derek Martin); sisters Kat (Jessie Wallace), Lynne (Elaine Lordan), Little Mo (Kacey Ainsworth); and grandmother Mo Harris (Laila Morse). Later, it emerges that Zoe is in fact Kat's daughter, and a product of incest, after Kat was raped by her uncle Harry Slater (Michael Elphick) in 1983, and Zoe was raised by Kat's parents, Charlie and Viv. This was nominated for Best Storyline at the British Soap Awards, as well as winning Best Single Episode in 2002. Another highly acclaimed storyline was Zoe's friendship with Kelly Taylor (Brooke Kinsella). In 2003, Zoe and Kelly made headlines in the UK in a New Year's Eve episode that was filmed on location in Scotland. In the storyline, Zoe, Kelly and others travel from London to Scotland, but their minibus crashes, leaving them stranded and injured on the freezing cold Scottish moors. While stranded, Kelly attends to an injured Zoe, leading to an emotional moment in which they share a kiss. The episode showcasing their kiss garnered 9.5 million viewers, with the exact moment of their kiss being watched by 44% of the available viewing audience.

One of Zoe's subsequent major storylines is when she becomes romantically involved with local hardman Dennis Rickman (Nigel Harman), which ends after Zoe lies about being pregnant and has sex with Dennis's father, Den Watts (Leslie Grantham) – though not before he pressured her into claiming that she is pregnant with Dennis's baby, as part of his last-ditch attempt to stop his adoptive daughter, Sharon Watts (Letitia Dean), from leaving Albert Square. Her exit storyline centred around the murder of Den during the show's 20th anniversary episode. Zoe conspires with his estranged wife, Chrissie Watts (Tracy-Ann Oberman), and their friend, Sam Mitchell (Kim Medcalf), to seek revenge on Den for the way he had victimised them. Their plan results in Zoe seemingly killing Den in the Queen Victoria public house after he attacked Chrissie; however, when Zoe left him behind, Den regained consciousness and Chrissie ultimately killed him. Zoe subsequently leaves Walford for Ibiza after making amends with Kat and Dennis. In June 2025, Zoe reconnects with Stacey after fabricating a story that she is on the run from loan sharks. During her second stint, much of Zoe's storylines were focused on her searching for, and ultimately being reunited with her long-lost twins, Jasmine Fisher (Indeyarna Donaldson-Holness) and Josh Goodwin (Joshua Vaughan), who were fathered by Anthony Trueman (Nicholas Bailey).

== Creation and characterisation ==
The character of Zoe and the rest of the Slater family were created during workshops with Tony Jordan and John Yorke. London actors were invited to improvise in groups, and the characters were created during these improvisations. Michelle Ryan was cast as Zoe, and made her first on-screen appearance on 18 September 2000. The family consisted of, grandmother Mo Harris (Laila Morse), father Charlie (Derek Martin), his five children, Lynne (Elaine Lordan), Kat (Jessie Wallace), Little Mo (Kacey Ainsworth), Zoe (Ryan), Belinda (Leanne Lakey), who was to be introduced to EastEnders at a later date, as well as Lynne's boyfriend Garry Hobbs (Ricky Groves). It later transpired that Kat was the mother of Zoe, after being raped by her uncle Harry Slater (Michael Elphick).

According to the BBC's head of drama series, Mal Young, the family was brought in as the serial did not "have enough solid families in the soap, there were a lot of fractured families and people who were alone." Ryan was cast in the role of Zoe after the character was developed at an improvisation session for thirty actors and actresses earlier in the year. He chose Lordan, Wallace, Ainsworth, Ryan and Lakey as the five sisters as they got on so well at the sessions. The actors performed a Nolans routine at the session, which was "later included on EastEnders as part of one of the Queen Vic's karaoke nights". The character is described as bolshy, defiant and a vivacious teenager who makes an impression on the men of Walford.

== Development ==
In 2001, an upcoming storyline involved Zoe and Kat, with Zoe asking if she can live with Harry. The News of the World reported that Kat would tell Zoe that she was actually her mother and that Harry had raped her when she was 13. An EastEnders source said, "Zoe thinks her mother is dead—but the truth is very different." In 2002, a story where Zoe runs away with Anthony to get married in secret was announced. That year, Ryan was rested from the soap on doctor's orders, by agreement from Louise Berridge, the executive producer, Ryan and her parents. Plans for character developments between Zoe and Anthony were delayed and plans for their on-screen marriage were pushed back, with the wedding storyline being re-written. In September that year, Ryan said she would return and was looking forward to it, and Berridge said she was "delighted" and hoped viewers would look forward to Zoe being reunited with the rest of her family.

=== Notable relationships ===
==== Kelly Taylor ====
The friendship between Zoe and Kelly Taylor (Brooke Kinsella) was a recurring storyline for both characters. In the British press, Kelly and Zoe were compared to two former popular EastEnders characters, who also shared a close screen friendship, Bianca Jackson (Patsy Palmer) and Tiffany Mitchell (Martine McCutcheon). Kinsella commented, "It is nice to be compared because they were great [characters] but, hopefully, [Michelle Ryan] and I will bring our own characters to light and show what we can do. We have so much in common and we balance each other out – when she's crazy I'll calm her down and vice-versa. It's worked well, which is why Kelly has been kept on, which is great for me but also for Michelle because she's got somebody to have fun with. Kelly's been one of the slowest developing characters and that's been good for me. I wasn't thrown into it and having Michelle has been great for me."

In 2003, Zoe and Kelly made headlines in the UK during the New Year's Eve episode that was filmed on-location in Scotland. In said episode, the pair along with some group of teenagers travel from London to Scotland for New Year's Eve, but their minibus crashes, leaving them stranded and injured on the freezing cold Scottish moors. While stranded, Kelly cares for an injured Zoe, they become overemotional, and kiss. Kinsella explained the reasons behind the kiss: "They're stuck in the hills, thinking they're going to die—it's a way of saying goodbye and also of showing how much they love each other as friends. Which is quite sweet really." She claimed that the kiss was made easier due to the fact that she was kissing her off-screen best friend: "That made it so much easier. We thought we were just going to be laughing and giggling the whole way through, but we were very professional. It was so cold that we just wanted to get it over with. We were shaking from cold—not from nerves—and it was raining, so we just thought, 'Let's do it and get it done with'. [...] We laugh about it now. When it came down to it, the truth was that it was just like any other screen kiss." The episode featuring their kiss attracted 9.5 million viewers, and the precise moment that they kissed was watched by 44% of the available viewing audience.

==== Dennis Rickman and Den Watts ====
In September 2004, a Christmas storyline created by Berridge that was to show Zoe fall pregnant with Dennis Rickman's (Nigel Harman) baby was axed by Berridge's successor, Kathleen Hutchison. Instead, Zoe was to be seduced by Dennis's father, Den (Leslie Grantham). An EastEnders insider revealed: "Dirty Den lives up to his name by seducing Zoe. He makes his move when she comments how handsome he looks for his age. But they are caught in the act by Dennis who is shocked and disgusted to see his dad snogging his girlfriend." Hutchison decided that Den would be killed off in a storyline involving three people plotting to kill him. The storyline saw Zoe, Chrissie and Sam plot his death, and a source said, "The three girls team up after deciding they have to get rid of Den but viewers will be left wondering who the actual killer is. They plot and scheme to give themselves alibis and exact their revenge for what Den has done to them."

=== First departure ===
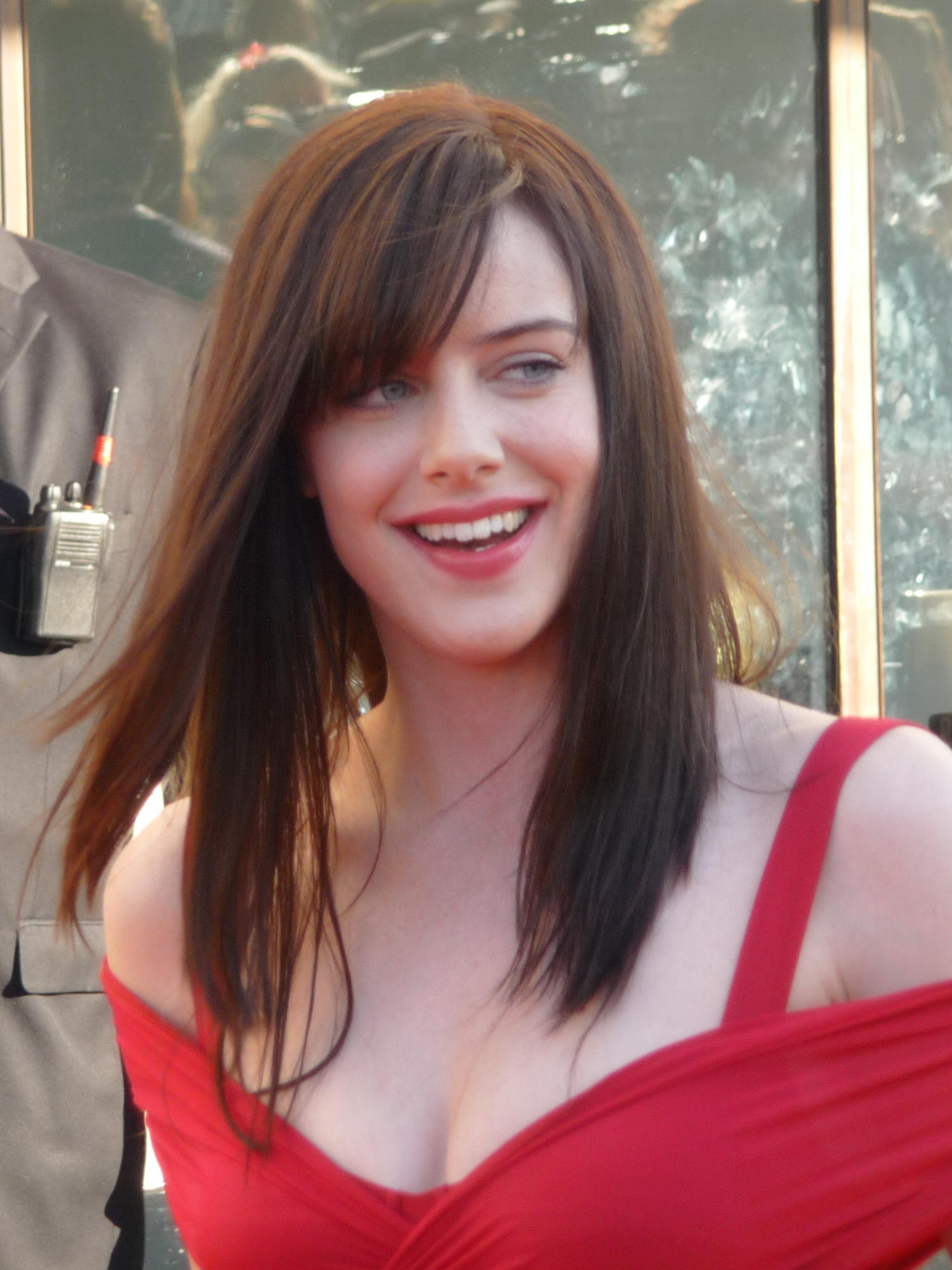
Michelle Ryan decided to leave her role as Zoe in 2005.

It was thought that Ryan was going to quit the soap after several reports of her leaving EastEnders. One of her friends who spoke in September 2004 revealed, "Without sounding arrogant, Michelle believes she has the looks and talent to succeed at the highest level. She has been in EastEnders for four years but sees her future very much in films and modelling. She realises the show has put her on the map but doesn't want to be typecast. "Because of her soap commitments she's had to turn down dozens of great modelling offers and feels her soap role is now holding her back. Michelle's happy to honour her contract but then will make the jump."

On 29 January 2005 it was announced after a lot of speculation that Ryan, along with Kim Medcalf (Sam), would be leaving. A source for the show said, "Michelle [Ryan] has made no secret of her plans to leave the soap in recent months. Despite her character being at the centre of some of the show's biggest storylines, the actress is now considering a modelling career." The source added, "Michelle is hot property and has been inundated with offers of other acting work. She's also had several offers of lucrative modelling projects." Speaking about her decision to quit she told The Sun, Everyone knew it was time for me to go and I knew it was time for me to move on."Then Jessie [Wallace], who plays my screen mum Kat, said, 'You're young, so get out there. Now's the time to go for it. You're only young once and you can't stay here forever.' "I've grown up in EastEnders. I've been here for four years, so I will miss everybody. But you get that feeling and when you know it's time to spread your wings and fly, you need to do that. Everyone says I'm doing the right thing." Her exit storyline was revealed saying, "She leaves because she can't stand everyone knowing what she did in order to persuade Dennis not to leave her," an insider told the newspaper. "It is truly gripping stuff and there won't be a dry eye in the house on the night."

Since her departure she told the Bristol Evening Post that she has no plans to return saying,"I just got quite bored in the end, to be honest. Doing the same thing day in, day out. It's just so boring. I like to jump from different things." "I always saw EastEnders as an apprenticeship," she told the Daily Record. "I always wanted to go on and do different things. I have some really good friends from that show but the door is closed." She said: "I've always taken chances. I think that's how you progress – by stepping out and doing different things. I really do like my freedom and jumping from job to job. I just want to work with people I admire and respect, wherever that be – big budget, low budget, leading role, supporting role."

=== Return speculation ===
The press reported on 18 April 2010 that Ryan was approached by the producers of EastEnders to return for a month around the Christmas period that year, coinciding with the return of Zoe's mother, Kat, and her husband, Alfie (Shane Richie). A BBC spokeswoman denied this, saying, "Speculation is rife about returning characters but this is not true. However, as with all characters, we would never say never." Talking about these rumours she replied, "No, [it's] not for me." It was again reported in August 2011 that Ryan was returning for a Christmas special. They reported that she was "excited" over possible storylines with Wallace and Richie. A BBC spokesperson dismissed the rumours, telling Digital Spy that there were no plans for Zoe to return. In April 2017, Ryan called for Zoe to be recast.

=== Reintroduction (2025) ===
Despite previously calling for a recast, in June 2025, Ryan made an unannounced return as Zoe in the episode broadcast on 16 June. Upon her return, Ryan said it felt like "coming home" and after filming her first few scenes "felt like [she'd] never been away." On his decision to reintroduce Ryan, executive producer Ben Wadey said, "Before I even stepped into the role, Zoe Slater was on my wish-list of returnees as although we haven't seen her on screen for twenty years, her character has transcended time due to her popular storylines. I was absolutely delighted when Michelle agreed to return, and I'm thrilled to welcome her back to Walford. Whilst I can't say too much at this stage, Zoe's return is just one of the many exciting storylines we have planned."

=== Second departure (2026) ===
In July 2026, it was announced Ryan had exited the role, with Zoe expected to depart later that same year. The Sun suggested Ryan's decision to exit the role came after she was refused time off from filming commitments with the serial, and that scriptwriters had opted to kill off the character rather than allow her the option to return. The publication also reported that Zoe's departure would occur after a fall that results in a head injury, and she would be discovered dead in bed by Kat the day after the incident. In August 2026, Ryan spoke with Radio Times concerning her exit, revealing she only agreed to a one-year return and that she supported the serial's decision to kill off Zoe. Scenes concerning Zoe's departure commenced airing during Episode 7398 on 10 September 2026 and concluded during Episode 7399 on 14 September. The latter served as a standalone episode that focused on the Moon and Slater families, following Zoe's death.

== Storylines ==
=== 2000–2005 ===
A teenage Zoe first arrives in Walford in September 2000 with her family, which consists of her sisters Kat Slater (Jessie Wallace), Lynne Hobbs (Elaine Lordan) and Little Mo Morgan (Kacey Ainsworth), their father Charlie Slater (Derek Martin), and their grandmother Mo Harris (Laila Morse). Over a year later, Zoe and Kat argue about Zoe's decision to move away from Walford to live with her uncle Harry Slater (Michael Elphick). Kat tells Zoe she cannot go, but Zoe walks out. Kat follows and after a heated argument reveals that she is Zoe's mother. She then explains that she fell pregnant at 13 after Harry raped her, thus revealing that Harry is her father. Zoe is shell-shocked, and Kat slashes her wrists in despair. Zoe runs away, unable to take in all the recent revelations.

While away, Zoe contacts Little Mo – the only other member of the family who did not know about Zoe's parentage – who persuades Zoe to come home, but after another argument with Kat, Zoe leaves again. She ends up living on the streets, where she is discovered sick and penniless by Roxy Drake (Tracy Brabin), a pimp determined to recruit Zoe. Roxy provides Zoe with meals and cigarettes, finds her a flat and forces her to prostitute herself. Roxy and fellow prostitute Kelly Taylor (Brooke Kinsella) dress and make-up Zoe, but she gets drunk and vomits on her client. Kat arrives on Christmas Day to take Zoe home, but Roxy tries to prevent her from taking Zoe, so Kat headbutts her.

Zoe gets engaged to Anthony Trueman (Nicholas Bailey), but leaves yet again, returning several months later, this time with Kelly in tow, and her engagement to Anthony is broken off.

In 2004, she briefly dates Dennis Rickman (Nigel Harman), but he is secretly in love with his adoptive half-sister Sharon Watts (Letitia Dean), and they eventually reveal their relationship. Dennis's father Den Watts (Leslie Grantham) suggests that to keep Dennis, Zoe should claim she is pregnant, in order to split Sharon and Dennis up. The plan works, but Zoe worries Dennis will realise she is not pregnant, and he refuses to sleep with her. After Zoe's attempts to get pregnant from other local men fail, Den offers to sleep with her so she can get pregnant and pretend the baby is Dennis's. Dennis catches them in bed together and leaves, but not before telling Den's wife, Chrissie Watts (Tracy-Ann Oberman).

Chrissie persuades Zoe to abort the baby and tells her they should team up for revenge on Den. They get together with Sam Mitchell (Kim Medcalf) to do this, meeting up in The Queen Victoria public house. Chrissie sends for Sharon, claiming Den is seriously ill. Sharon instead overhears Den admitting everything to the three other women as they confront him. Sharon then disowns Den before leaving Walford once more; Chrissie had orchestrated all of this – and achieved her aim of Sharon disowning Den – as payback for cheating on her with Zoe. Right after Sharon leaves, Den realises what Chrissie had done and proceeds to attack her – smashing her head against a fruit machine. Zoe stops him by attacking him with a metal doorstop, supposedly killing him. She runs off and Sam goes after her to calm her down. However, he is not dead, and he grabs Chrissie. She hits him again with the doorstop, finally killing Den. Following his murder, Zoe is led to believe that she killed Den, though Sam sees Chrissie kill Den and eventually tells Zoe, who punches Chrissie. Zoe leaves for Ibiza later in 2005 after having an emotional goodbye with Kat, while Chrissie is eventually caught out and charged with Den's murder, and Sam subsequently goes on the run. Just before her departure, Zoe had revealed the truth about Den fathering her baby and that she had terminated the pregnancy, having previously claimed to have suffered a miscarriage. This followed Sharon and Dennis's return to Walford, and a fierce verbal attack on Dennis by Zoe's family.

In 2015, Kat reveals that Zoe has moved to Spain and announces to Mo and Stacey Slater (Lacey Turner) that she will start saving up to visit Zoe. However, Mo tells Stacey that Zoe does not want to see Kat. Mo attempts to contact Zoe to get her to reconsider, but Kat finds out two days later in a text from Zoe that she cannot see her because of her new job and boyfriend and she feels she needs to move on with her life without Kat. In May 2015, Kat visits the convent where she gave birth to Zoe in 1984 and it is revealed to the viewers that Kat, unknowingly, had had twins, a girl and a boy – meaning Zoe has a twin brother, Luke Slater aka Dermott Dolan (Oisín Stack). Kat later moves to Spain off-screen and visits Zoe, who rejects her mother, leaving Kat devastated. Upon her return, Kat reveals that Zoe is now engaged.

In July 2022, it is revealed that Zoe has returned to London when Stacey's daughter Lily Slater (Lillia Turner) tracks her down on social media and invites her to Kat's upcoming wedding to Phil Mitchell (Steve McFadden). In an effort to cheer up Kat, Lily also arranges for Zoe to meet with Kat at Peggy's wine bar that evening, but Zoe does not turn up, leaving Kat and Lily disappointed.

In September 2024, Zoe was mentioned by Chrissie when Sharon is sent to prison for degrading a judge during Dean Wicks' (Matt Di Angelo) trial for the murder of Keanu Taylor (Danny Walters). Sharon comes face to face with Chrissie who justifies her actions for killing Den by explaining that if Zoe had not intervened, Den would've killed her.

=== 2025–2026 ===
When Stacey leaves Walford to take a break following Martin Fowler's (James Bye) death, she rents a flat outside the Square. It is later revealed that Zoe had reconnected with Stacey and is staying with her, claiming she was on the run from loan sharks. Concerned, Stacey leaves her children with Lynne and contacts Alfie for help. Together, Stacey and Alfie confront Zoe after she returns to the flat, and they discover she had fabricated the story in order to obtain money. They threaten to call Kat, unaware that she has already managed to track them down. Zoe narrowly avoids Kat and then decides to go back to Spain, ominously telling Stacey that she has done something bad and that her family would never forgive her. Alfie decides to follow Zoe to Spain in an attempt to convince her to return to Walford, telling Kat he is going to Australia to visit his brother Spencer Moon (Christopher Parker). Alfie later returns, having failed to find Zoe; he later admits to Kat he had been trying to help Zoe.

Zoe's half-brother Tommy Moon (Sonny Kendall) contacts and meets her after admitting he too cannot handle Kat; he pleads to follow her to Spain if he lends her his savings. Zoe agrees and returns to Walford as a condition to collect it. There, she reunites with Kat and rejects her, revealing she loathes herself for being a product of rape and incest.

Whilst she is leaving, Ravi Gulati (Aaron Thiara) and Jack Branning (Scott Maslen) fight over a gun, causing it to discharge, striking Zoe with the stray bullet. After falling unconscious, a flashback reveals that she gave birth to twins, a boy and a girl, in 2006 after leaving Walford; Zoe deserted them at the hospital, wrongly believing that the girl had died. While at the hospital, Kat answers Zoe's phone and issues a threat to the unknown caller, who is revealed to be Max Branning (Jake Wood). It later emerges that Max and Zoe had a fling earlier in the year. Max had given Zoe money to hire a private investigator, Greg Dolan (Dean Williamson), to track down her son. However, when Greg tried to sexually assault her, Zoe fought back, convinced she had killed him.

Following an argument about the incident, Max walked away from her, causing her to turn to Stacey. One evening, Stacey witnesses Max and Zoe kissing but although Max dumps Zoe, Stacey still heads for Brazil. Following a confrontation, Zoe reveals to Sharon that her husband Dennis was the father of Zoe's twins; she later admits her lie to a suspicious Kat. Following her recovery from being shot, Zoe remains in Walford and attempts to stabilise her life; the efforts are undermined by growing tensions with Stacey's mother, Jean Slater (Gillian Wright).

While readjusting to life in Walford, Zoe finds herself the target of persistent stalking. As the incidents intensify, her paranoia grows, leading her to suspect various women in her circle, including Vicki Fowler (Alice Haig) and Sam Mitchell. During this time, Anthony Trueman returns to the Square and discovers that Zoe's daughter survived infancy and he is her biological father. During Christmas 2025, Chelsea Fox (Zaraah Abrahams) reveals to Zoe and Kat that Anthony had deceived Kat regarding the fate of Zoe's twins, and that they were both alive. Zoe confronts Anthony, suspecting him to be her stalker.

During an altercation in the upstairs area of the Vic, Anthony encounters Zoe, resulting in her being knocked unconscious as she strikes her head on the staircase. Kat later finds Zoe and insists on knowing what has transpired, having discovered Anthony lying motionless on the floor and believing him to be dead. Chrissie then reveals herself to be Zoe's stalker, and admits to manipulating Zoe's daughter, Jasmine Fisher (Indeyarna Donaldson-Holness), into aiding her in carrying out her plans. Following their confrontation, Chrissie departs, and Zoe contacts the police to report Anthony's death, subsequently turning herself in for the crime.

However, the murderer is later revealed to be Jasmine, who was defending herself and Zoe from Anthony. When Kat finds this out, she turns Jasmine into the police, exonerating Zoe, who becomes determined to find a video recorded by Jasmine of her killing Anthony in self-defence and prove her innocence. Zoe finally meets her son, Josh Goodwin (Joshua Vaughan), who arrives in Walford with his adoptive mother, Sandra (Dawn Steele), looking for answers about Jasmine, from whom he was separated as a child. Sandra had put Jasmine back into care after blaming her for the death of her husband, Keith, in a car accident years earlier. After Jasmine's acquittal and release, Zoe begins to build a relationship with her children.

After a period away from Walford visiting Lynne, Zoe finds Charlie's old taxi for sale online and announces her intention to buy it. Zoe gets into difficulty with the dealers and suffers a fall when trying to run away from the car dealers, hitting her head on some bricks before stealing the taxi. Later on the same evening, while in pain from her injury she catches Max and Linda Carter (Kellie Bright) kissing in the barrel store, despite Max having just married Cindy Beale (Michelle Collins). Max follows her upstairs and assumes she is drunk when she becomes disorientated. Zoe begs for Max to help but he leaves, and she collapses on her bed and dies. Kat discovers her body later in the night.

The following morning, Kat remains with Zoe's lifeless body, initially refusing to accept that she has died. Alfie discovers Zoe's body, before Jasmine, Josh and the rest of the Slater family learn of her death. Kat struggles to let Zoe's body be taken away and, as it leaves the Vic, runs after the vehicle carrying her. Overcome with grief and guilt over Zoe's untreated head injury, Kat isolates herself from her family and later becomes distressed when she finds the family holding a vigil in Zoe's bedroom. She is subsequently comforted by Sharon and Oscar Branning (Pierre Counihan-Moullier). After Zoe's post-mortem, the police reveal that she made a 999 call shortly before her death in which she said that "he left me", leading Kat to investigate who was with Zoe during her final hours. She obtains Zoe's phone records through Jack and, after discovering that Zack had called Zoe that day, publicly accuses him of being responsible. Zack denies any involvement, while Max, who is devastated after hearing Zoe's passing, conceals that he was the person she had referred to.

== Reception ==
In 2002, Zoe and Kat's storyline was nominated for Best Storyline at the British Soap Awards, but lost out to the bullying plot in Brookside. The episode with the truth about Kat being Zoe's mother won Best Single Episode. For her portrayal of Zoe, Ryan was nominated in the category of Best Actress at the 2005 British Soap Awards. For EastEnders' 25th anniversary in 2010, Zoe finding out about her mother was voted the greatest EastEnders moment by What's on TV. In addition, the EastEnders website named the moment where Kat told Zoe that she was her mother one of the most 'dramatic endings'.

The kiss between Zoe and Kelly received criticism. Lesbian news site AfterEllen.com branded it a "gratuitous ratings-stunt" and said "The writers bottled out and the two young women dismissed it as a one-off, assuring each other that neither of them was 'like that,' leaving lesbian and bisexual viewers feeling cheated. This was a wasted opportunity, a chance to explore an emotionally complex situation between best friends that became just another exploitive TV moment instead." In an interview about homosexual television characters in The Guardian, scriptwriter Daran Little criticised lesbians in British soaps: "Most lesbian characters are so lipstick. They start off straight and, lo and behold, they just can't resist it. You can see the straight fantasy at work behind the character". Journalist Paul Flynn stated that Zoe was an example of this, describing her as a "tabloid-friendly 18-year-old—who [...] brushed with lesbianism for all of five minutes." Kinsella defended the kiss in an interview, commenting, "It's not a gratuitous ratings getting move, it's not some kind of big lesbian kiss. It's the way two best friends who have a lot of love for each other show their emotions."

In 2020, Sara Wallis and Ian Hyland from the Daily Mirror placed Zoe 59th on their ranked list of the best EastEnders characters of all time, writing that she was most popular for her 2001 "legendary slanging match" with Kat where it is revealed that she is Kat's daughter.
