= Convenience (film) =

- Directed by: Keri Collins
- Written by: Simon Fantauzzo
- Produced by: Ray Panthaki
- Starring: Ray Panthaki; Adeel Akhtar; Vicky McClure; Anthony Head
- Cinematography: Stil Williams
- Edited by: Richard Blackburn
- Distributed by: Spirit Entertainment; Miracle Communications Ltd
- Release dates: October 5, 2013 (Raindance Film Festival); October 2, 2015
- Running time: 87 minutes
- Country: United Kingdom
- Language: English
- Budget: £80,000

Convenience is a 2013 British dark comedy film about two friends who, needing to pay a debt they cannot afford, try to rob a petrol station and end up posing as clerks for the night. The film was written by Simon Fantauzzo and directed by Keri Collins.

== Cast ==
- Ray Panthaki as Ajay
- Adeel Akhtar as Shaan
- Vicky McClure as Levi
- Anthony Head as Barry
- Jenny Bede as Debbie
- James Bradshaw as Clive
- Daniel Caltagirone as Tommy
- Margaret Jackman as Mavis
- Verne Troyer as Dwight
- Tom Bell as Stoner 1
- Tony Way as Stoner 2

== Production ==
The film was shot in a petrol garage located in Gorseinon, South Wales.

== Critical reception ==
Convenience attracted a positive response from audiences and critics alike. Leslie Felperin, writing for The Guardian, called the film a "fun-fuelled comedy caper" with "good, genuinely funny dialogue". Felperin praised the "likable, tightly synchronised cast". Nev Pierce, for Empire Online called the film "very funny [...] simple, but strong". Louie Freeman-Bassett, for Gorilla Film Online felt Convenience would have been better produced as a fifty-minute play, but singled Adeel Akhtar's performance as the film's best.
