= The Feral Generation =

- Directed by: Andrew Jones
- Written by: Andrew Jones
- Produced by: Ray Panthaki; Stuart Brennan; Neil Jones
- Starring: Ray Panthaki; Brooke Kinsella
- Edited by: Ian Grey
- Music by: John Rea
- Release date: 2007
- Running time: 91 minutes
- Language: English
- Budget: £500,000

The Feral Generation is a British feature film written and directed by Welsh filmmaker Andrew Jones and starring Ray Panthaki and Brooke Kinsella in the leading roles. The film was shot in Swansea and Cardiff, South Wales in 2007 and was the first film to be produced by London-based production company Urban Way Productions Ltd. In June 2008, the film was awarded Best UK Feature Film at the Swansea Life Film Festival.

== Plot ==
In 2004, a Home Office survey revealed that there are 20 to 60 youngsters, aged 16 to 24, living rough in each inner city in the UK. They are responsible for vast levels of crime and in almost all cases they have come from broken homes and a history of abuse, both physical and sexual, most of the time inflicted on them by their parents. Nikki, 18, fled a sexually abusive homelife and a succession of foster families to live on the street. There she met Vincent, 24, the product of heroin-addicted parents. Together, they spend their days trying to survive the perils of living rough and supporting their drug addictions.

== Reviews ==
"So here’s my take on The Feral Generation. I think Andrew Jones has pulled off a genuinely objective, dispassionate study of an aspect of modern life about which it is very hard indeed to be either dispassionate or objective. The Feral Generation is not a film that casts judgements – we are left to do that for ourselves – but it simply documents in detail something which we normally only see briefly at a distance...This is terrific acting, this really is award-winning stuff.And it is helped by Jones' amazing dialogue which manages to be realistic and credible enough to fit in the mouths of these characters yet at the same time erudite enough to hold our attention and make us think about what is being said...

Frankly, some of the direction is astounding; there are some pauses in the interviews that seem to last forever and shots of the couple hugging and tearful which last even longer. This is incredibly assured and confident work for a young director on his second feature. The Feral Generation is a magnificent film, powerful but not preachy, serious but not sentimental. In terms of storytelling, it's simply masterful: stunning acting, excellent script, amazing direction, supremely competent on every technical level."

Review of The Feral Generation by film critic MJ Simpson.

== Awards ==
=== Swansea Life Film Festival ===
Year	Result	Award	Category/Recipient(s)
2008	Won	Best UK Feature Film	Best UK Feature Film for The Feral Generation
