= Mud (TV series) =

- Starring: Russell Brand; Brooke Kinsella; Russell Tovey; Susie Blake; Paloma Baeza; Matthew Steer; Victoria Wicks; Dickon Tolson; Trevor Peacock
- Country of origin: United Kingdom
- Original language: English
- No. of series: 2
- No. of episodes: 14

Production
- Running time: 20–23 minutes

Original release
- Network: BBC One
- Release: 17 February 1994 – 30 March 1995

Mud is a 1994 CBBC television drama, starring Russell Tovey. In the series, Tovey, Brooke Kinsella and Rhona Nolasca play a group of disadvantaged children taken by their social worker (Susie Blake) to an outdoor activity centre to escape their problems.

The staff at the centre were vicious Miss Palmer (Victoria Wicks), ditsy Henry (Gareth Corke) and teenage lovers Shane and Philippa (Russell Brand and Paloma Baeza).

== Series one ==
The first series of Mud aired across seven weeks from 17 February to 31 March 1994.

Episode one begins as three children from a rough London council estate; Bill Bailey (Tovey), his sister Ruby (Kinsella) and Alice (Nolasca) are whisked off to an outdoor activity centre in the heart of the country by their social worker, the musical Miss Dudderidge (Blake). Their arrival is not welcomed by the bad tempered and nasty Thelfont Heights manageress, Miss Palmer (Wicks) and the privileged children; Simon (Matthew Steer), James (James Beattie), Julia (Sarah Cronin-Stanley) and Harriet (Rudo Kwaramba) who are staying there. With Ruby sneaking into the centre with her brother, there is not room for her and their adventurous future is in jeopardy. In a bid to rid the urban new additions, Palmer directs them to stay in tents at dangerous Five Wells Point, though endangers the whole group when they fall down an old well, which starts to fill with water. Only Ruby is safe and has to make her own way back to the centre to ask workers Shane (Brand), Philippa (Baeza) and Henry (Gareth Corke) for help, and is guided on her way back by a feral child, nicknamed Wild Boy (Zoot Lynam), who was raised by animals since he was an infant, following a car crash at Five Wells Point resulting in the fatality of the rest of his family. As a reward for rescuing the group, Ruby and her peers are allowed to stay at the centre.

Episode two starts with Miss Palmer continuing her efforts to remove the three council children and their social worker Miss Dudderidge from the centre. She's adamant to have a £50 booking fee from Ruby by the end of the day and has a plan to foil all of her fundraising efforts with help from Shane and Philippa. The kids clean cars and wash laundry and make their money and present it to Palmer. Furious that her plans have not worked, she takes Harriet's purse and claims that Bill, Ruby and Alice stole the money from it to pay the booking fee. As Miss Palmer forces the unfortunate children into the van to head home, Wild Boy breaks into her office and exposes Harriet's money and purse on her desk, embarrassing her into letting Bill, Ruby and Alice stay.

Episode three

Episode four

Episode five

Episode six

Episode seven

== Series two ==
The second series of Mud aired from 16 February to 30 March 1995. Fans recall this season including more fantasy and adventure than the former. Brooke Kinsella, Russell Tovey, Susie Blake return. Trevor Peacock was a new addition to the cast.

Episode one

Episode two

Episode three

Episode four

Episode five

Episode six

Episode seven
