= Keegan Taylor =

Zimbabwean cricketer (1984–2013)

Personal information
- Full name: Keegan James Taylor
- Born: 27 September 1984; Mutare, Manicaland, Zimbabwe
- Died: 27 December 2013 (aged 29); Harare, Zimbabwe
- Batting: Right-handed
- Bowling: Right-arm off break

Domestic team information
- Years: Team
- 2001/02: Manicaland

Career statistics
Competition	FC
Matches	3
Runs scored	42
Batting average	10.50
100s/50s	0/0
Top score	11*
Balls bowled	185
Wickets	5
Bowling average	27.40
5 wickets in innings	0
10 wickets in match	0
Best bowling	3/42
Catches/stumpings	1/–
- Source: ESPNcricinfo, 12 July 2021

Keegan James Taylor (27 September 1984 – 27 December 2013) was a Zimbabwean cricketer. A right-handed batsman and right-arm off break bowler, he played three first-class matches for his home province Manicaland during the 2001–02 Logan Cup.

Following a short illness, Taylor died of heart failure on 27 December 2013 in Harare, aged 29.
