= Ray Panthaki =

British actor

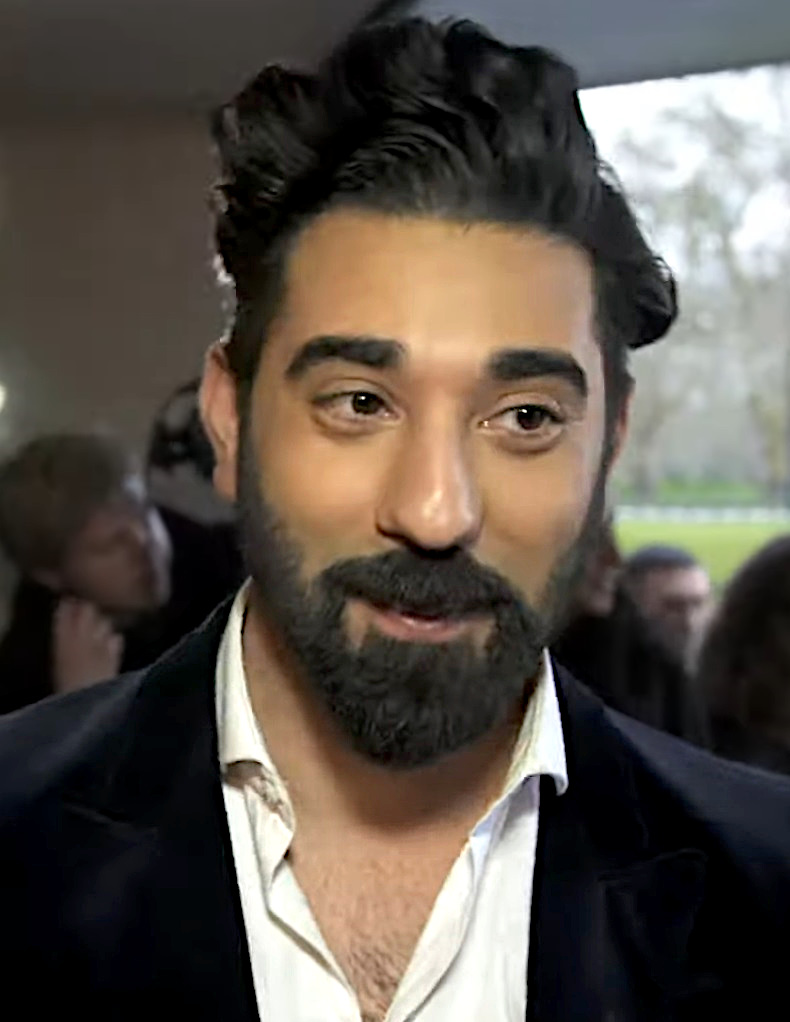
- Panthaki at the 6th Asian Awards 2016
- Born: 20 January 1979 (age 47); London, England
- Occupations: Actor; screenwriter; director; film producer
- Years active: 1999–present

Ray Panthaki (/pənˈθɑːki/; born 20 January 1979) is a British actor, writer, director, and producer. On television, he is known for his roles in the BBC series EastEnders (2003–2005) and Blessed (2005), the ITV series Marcella (2016–2020), the Sky Atlantic series Gangs of London and the Netflix series Away (both 2020). For his performance in the film Boiling Point (2021), he received a British Independent Film Award nomination. His other films include Convenience (2013).

He was elected to the BAFTA Film Committee in 2024.

== Early life ==
Panthaki was born in London to second-generation Indian parents. His parents belong to India's Parsi minority community.

== Career ==
Panthaki appeared in the 1999 anthology Tube Tales and made his feature film debut as Hassan B in Sacha Baron Cohen's 2002 comedy Ali G Indahouse. This was followed by roles in the films 28 Days Later, Provoked and the 2006 film Kidulthood which he also produced.

In 2006, Panthaki was nominated for Best Supporting Actor in a Play at the TMA Theatre Awards for his role in Gladiator Games. Later that year, he set up the London-based production company Urban Way. Panthaki made his West End theatrical debut in July 2008 in the play In My Name at the Trafalgar Studios. He has performed twice at the Royal Court Theatre in London in Where Do We Live by Christopher Shinn and The Westbridge by Rachel De-Lehay. He went on to play a leading role in Tanika Gupta's The Empress for the Royal Shakespeare Company directed by Emma Rice.

He starred in the films It's a Wonderful Afterlife (2010) and Interview with a Hitman (2012).

In 2013, Panthaki's directorial debut Life Sentence, a film which he also wrote, won Best UK Short at the East End Film Festival 2013. In 2013, Panthaki produced and starred in the comedy film Convenience starring alongside Vicky McClure and Adeel Akhtar. The film's director Keri Collins won Best Breakthrough at the 2014 BAFTA Cymru for his work on the film.

In 2014, he was announced as one of 18 BAFTA Breakthrough Brits a celebration of Britain's stars of tomorrow alongside fellow actors Stacy Martin, Katie Leung and Callum Turner. In 2016, Panthaki was cast as DCI Rav Sangha in Hans Rosenfeldt's Nordic noir detective series Marcella.

In 2017, it was announced that Panthaki had signed on to Wash Westmoreland's Colette, a biopic about the French novelist Sidonie-Gabrielle Colette, to play real-life French playwright Pierre Veber. Panthaki attended the world premiere at the 2018 Sundance Film Festival alongside co-stars Keira Knightley and Dominic West, where the film received positive reviews. The following year, he portrayed journalist Kamal Ahmed in the film Official Secrets.

In 2020, Panthaki appeared in the Netflix series Away, alongside Hilary Swank, as Group Captain Ram Arya, second in command on a mission to Mars.

At the British Independent Film Awards 2021, Panthaki was nominated for the BIFA for Best Supporting Actor for his role as Freeman in Boiling Point alongside Stephen Graham.

Panthaki is set to direct In Starland.

== Filmography ==
Key
†	Denotes works that have not yet been released

=== Film ===
Year	Title	Role	Notes
1999	Jump Boy	Shamil	Short film
1999	Tube Tales	Mo	Segment: "Grasshopper"
2002	Ali G Indahouse	Hassan B	
2002	Licks	Pizza man	Short film; also co-producer
2002	28 Days Later	Private Bedford	
2003	Bollywood Queen	Anil	
2006	Kidulthood	Mark	Also co-producer
2006	Provoked	Ravi	
2007	Veils	Samir	Short film
2007	The Feral Generation	Vincent	Also producer
2009	City Rats	Dean	Also executive producer
2010	It's a Wonderful Afterlife	Jazz Sethi	
2011	Screwed	Neil	
2012	Interview with a Hitman	Franco	
2012	The Man Inside	Bose	Also executive producer
2013	Jadoo		
2013	Convenience	Ajay	Also producer
2014	Cryptic	Cochise	
2015	World War Dead: Rise of the Fallen	Marcus	
2016	One Crazy Thing	Jay Veer	Also producer
2016	Oysters Have Feelings Too	Jay	Short film
2016	Ghosted	Paul	Short film
2018	Colette	Veber	
2019	Official Secrets	Kamal Ahmed	
2020	Ernie		Writer and producer
2021	SAS: Red Notice	Prime Minister Atwood	
2021	Boiling Point	Freeman	Also executive producer
2023	Bonus Track	Mr Zeppelin	
2025	Black Diamond		
TBA	Fortunate Sons †		

=== Television ===
Year	Title	Role	Notes
1998	The Bill	Charlie	Episode: "Taking Sides"
2000	Losing It	Ray	Television film
2001	The Armando Iannucci Shows		Episode: "Communication"
2001	My Family	Gary	Episode: "Trust Never Sleeps"
2002	Blood Strangers	Zafar Wahid	Television film
2002	Spooks	Chalak Ahmed	Episode: "One Last Dance"; uncredited
2003	Rehab	Naz	Television film
2003	Doctors	Duncan Marks	Episode: "Donations"
2003–2005	EastEnders	Ronny	158 episodes
2005	Blessed	Lance	8 episodes
2006	Strictly Confidential	Ali	Series 1 Episode 3
2013	Life of Crime	DS Nabeel Kothari	Episode: "1997"
2014	DCI Banks	Jeff Kitson	Episodes: "Bad Boy Parts 1 & 2"
2014	The Wrong Mans	Khalil	2 episodes
2015	Crackanory	Nasim	1 episode
2016–2020	Marcella	DI/DCI Rav Sangha	24 episodes
2020	Gangs of London	Jevan Kapadia	8 episodes
2020	Away	Ram Arya	10 episodes
2022	The Serpent Queen	Charles, Cardinal of Lorraine	13 episodes
2023	Boiling Point	Freeman	

=== Video games ===
Year	Title	Role	Notes
2020	Dreams	Dreams architect	
