= Boiling Point, California =

Unincorporated community in California, United States

- Unincorporated community
- Location within California Location within the United States
- Coordinates: 34°31′19.97″N 118°15′44.28″W
- Country: United States
- State: California
- County: Los Angeles
- Elevation: 3,163 ft (964 m)
- Time zone: UTC-8 (Pacific (PST))
  - Summer (DST): UTC-7 (PDT)
- FIPS code: 06-07305
- GNIS ID: 1660355

Boiling Point is an archaic placename in the Antelope Valley of the Mojave Desert, in northern Los Angeles County, California, United States. The name refers to a landmark hill along the Sierra Highway, 12 mi (19 km), west of Palmdale, where "many radiators blew their stacks after a tedious climb. Traffic would back up for miles."

== Area attractions ==
Ritter Ranch Park, a multi-purpose recreational area, is located north of the area along Boiling Point Road. Boiling Point Road has been described as a transmission-line access route.
