= Boiling Point (2021 TV series) =

2021 television documentary series

- Genre: Documentary
- Country of origin: United States
- Original language: English
- No. of series: 1
- No. of episodes: 6

Production
- Executive producers: Jason Samuels; Mitch Weitzner
- Production company: CBS News

Original release
- Network: BET
- Release: February 21 – March 23, 2021

Boiling Point is an American six-part television documentary series which premiered on February 21, 2021 on BET.

== Episodes ==
No.	Title	Original release date	U.S. viewers (millions)
1	"L.A. Riots"	February 21, 2021	0.18
2	"Attica"	February 28, 2021	0.19
3	"Bloody Sunday"	March 2, 2021	0.18
4	"Schoolhouse Door"	March 9, 2021	0.17
5	"Hurricane Katrina"	March 16, 2021	0.20
6	"George Floyd"	March 23, 2021	0.19
