= Badcock =

Badcock is a surname of English origin, properly 'Bartcock', or son of Bartholemew. In his history of the Badcock family, published in "Miscellanea Genealogica et Heraldica, London, 1927" Colonel J.C Tyler writes of his research into the Badcock name: "One cannot fail to be struck with the great number of priests, parsons and men of literary repute. There are also in evidence merchants both by sea and by land, also landowners, soldiers and sailors, besides those engaged in the principal industry of weaving in Devon and Somerset, which includes the woolcombers, sergemakers and men of similar crafts".

Notable persons with this surname have included:

- General Sir Alexander Robert Badcock, KCB, CSI (1844–1907), British general in the Indian Army
- Blanche Badcock (1892–1957), British rifle shooter and farmer
- Christopher Badcock (born 1946), British sociologist
- Felix Badcock (1935–2015), English rower
- Henry Stanhope Badcock, founder of Badcock Home Furniture
- Jack Clement Badcock (1900–1982), English naturalist, historian, writer, and painter
- Jack Badcock (1914–1982), Australian cricketer
- John Badcock (writer) (fl. 1816–1830), English sporting writer
- John Badcock (cricketer) (1883–1940), English cricketer
- John Badcock (artist) (born 1952), New Zealand artist
- John Badcock (rower) (1903–1976), British rower
- Kevin Badcock (born 1951), Australian former cricketer
- Lovell Badcock (1744–1797), High Sheriff of Buckinghamshire
- General Sir Lovell Benjamin Lovell (Badcock) (1786–1861), British lieutenant-general
- Peter Badcock (1934–1967), Australian recipient of the Victoria Cross
- Richard Neale Badcock (1721–1783), English merchant and a director of the South Sea Company
- Samuel Badcock (1747–1788), English theologian and literary critic
- Ted Badcock (1897–1982), New Zealand Test cricketer
- Thomas Stanhope Badcock (1749–1821), High Sheriff of Buckinghamshire
- William Badcock (1622–1698), London goldsmith, hilt-maker and author
- Vice Admiral William Stanhope Lovell (Badcock) (1788–1859), British vice-admiral and veteran of Trafalgar

== See also ==
- Badcock Home Furniture
