= Aubrey-Fletcher baronets =

Title in the Baronetage of Great Britain

- Creation date: 20 May 1782
- Created by: George III
- Baronetage: Baronetage of Great Britain
- First holder: Sir Henry Fletcher, 1st Baronet
- Present holder: Sir Henry Aubrey-Fletcher, 8th Baronet
- Heir apparent: John Robert Aubrey-Fletcher
- Former seat: Ashley Park, Surrey
- Motto: Martis non Cupidinis (Belonging to Mars, not Cupid)

The Fletcher, later Aubrey-Fletcher Baronetcy, of Clea Hall in the County of Cumberland, is a title in the Baronetage of Great Britain. It was created on 20 May 1782 for Henry Fletcher, a Director of the Honourable East India Company He was Member of Parliament.for Cumberland from 1768 to 1806.

The 2nd Baronet was his son Henry, High Sheriff of Cumberland from 1810 to 1811. The 4th Baronet, a Conservative politician, assumed in 1903 by Royal licence the additional surname of Aubrey on inheriting the Aubrey estates, of Sir John Aubrey, 6th Baronet, on the death of Charles Aubrey of Dorton House. His brother the 5th Baronet also added the surname of Aubrey on succeeding to the title in 1910.

The 6th Baronet was Lord-Lieutenant of Buckinghamshire from 1954 to 1961, and the 7th Baronet was High Sheriff of Buckinghamshire in 1961. The 8th Baronet became Lord-Lieutenant of Buckinghamshire in 2006.

== Fletcher, Aubrey-Fletcher baronets, of Clea Hall and Ashley Park (1782) ==
- Sir Henry Fletcher, 1st Baronet (1727–1807). He established the family seat at Ashley Park, Walton-on-Thames, Surrey. He was MP for Cumberland from 1768 to 1802.
- Sir Henry Fletcher, 2nd Baronet (4 February 1772 – 10 August 1821). Fletcher was the son of Sir Henry Fletcher, 1st Baronet, and his wife Catherine Lintot. He married Frances Sophia Vaughan in 1801. They had at least one child. From 1810 to 1811 Fletcher served as High Sheriff of Cumberland. He died in August 1821, aged 49, and was succeeded in the baronetcy by his son, Henry. Lady Fletcher died in February 1828.
- Sir Henry Fletcher, 3rd Baronet (18 September 1807 – 6 September 1851). Fletcher was the son of Sir Henry Fletcher, 2nd Baronet, and his wife Frances Sophia Vaughan. He was educated at New College, Oxford. He married Emily Maria Browne in 1834.
- Sir Henry Aubrey-Fletcher, 4th Baronet (1835–1910)
- Sir Lancelot Aubrey-Fletcher, 5th Baronet (13 March 1846 – 5 January 1937). He was the second son of Sir Henry Fletcher, 3rd Baronet, and his wife Emily Maria Browne, and the younger brother of Sir Henry Aubrey-Fletcher, 4th Baronet, who died without issue in 1910. The same year he assumed by Royal licence the additional surname of Aubrey. Fletcher was married three times and had at least three children. He married firstly Gertrude Isabella Howell (d. 1878). They had one son. After her death he married secondly Emily Harriet Wade (d. 1911). After her death he married thirdly Aileen Mary Macpherson. In 1916 Aubrey-Fletcher donated part of his brother's estate in Angmering to the parish to be used as a recreation ground. The area is today known as Fletcher's Field. Aubrey-Fletcher died in January 1937 and was succeeded in the baronetcy by his son, Henry. Lady Aubrey-Fletcher died in June 1968.
- Sir Henry Lancelot Aubrey-Fletcher, 6th Baronet (1887–1969)
- Sir John Henry Lancelot Aubrey-Fletcher, 7th Baronet (22 August 1912 – 19 June 1992)
- Sir Henry Egerton Aubrey-Fletcher, 8th Baronet (born 1945)

The heir apparent is the present holder's son John Robert Aubrey-Fletcher (born 1977).

== Arms ==
Coat of arms of Aubrey-Fletcher baronets
Crest: 1. A horse's head argent charged with a trefoil gules (Fletcher); 2. An eagle's head erased or (Aubrey).; Escutcheon Quarterly: 1st and 4th, sable, a cross engrailed argent, between four plates, each charged with an arrow of the first (Fletcher) , 2nd and 3rd, azure, a chevron between three eagle’s heads erased or (Aubrey) Motto Martis non Cupidinis (Belonging to Mars, not Cupid)

== Notes ==
Baronetage of Great Britain
Preceded by Turner baronets	Fletcher baronets of Clea Hall; 20 May 1782	Succeeded by Drake baronets
