= Richard Neale Badcock =

London merchant

Richard Neale Badcock (1721–1783) was a wealthy London merchant and a director of the South Sea Company.

He was baptised at St Martin's Ludgate on 1 July 1721, the son of John Badcock, an eminent London mercer and Eunice Neale, daughter of Noah Neale Esq, of Stamford Baron.

He and his brother, John Neale Badcock, carried out considerable trade with linen merchants in Amsterdam and operated their business at Ludgate Hill, London, just a short distance from Saint Paul's Cathedral, and where Richard Neale Badcock is recorded as having been a scholar at St Pauls School.

He was a grandson of William Badcock, the London goldsmith and father of William Badcock (1772–1802), who married Sophia Cumberland, a daughter of the dramatist Richard Cumberland, (1732–1811).

His uncle, the merchant, Richard Badcock (d 1722), married Jane, the daughter of Sir Salathiel Lovell, from which line of the family came a number of prominent military and naval persons, including General Sir Lovell Benjamin Badcock and Vice Admiral William Stanhope Badcock.
