= Simon Boyle =

British business executive (1941–2020)

Sir Simon Boyle KCVO JP DL
- Boyle in 2014
- Born: Simon Hugh Patrick Boyle; 22 March 1941
- Died: 4 September 2020 (aged 79)
- Occupation: Business executive

Sir Simon Hugh Patrick Boyle KCVO JP DL (22 March 1941 – 4 September 2020) was a British business executive who was Lord Lieutenant of Gwent from 2001 to 2016.

== Biography ==
Boyle was born on 22 March 1941, the second son of Lieutenant-Colonel Patrick John Salvin Boyle (1910–1944) and his wife Mary Elizabeth Fleetwood Fuller, OBE, JP, DL (1916–1996), the daughter of Major Robert Fleetwood Fuller (1875–1955), JP, DL, of Great Chalfield, Melksham, Wiltshire (of which county he was High Sheriff in 1926). The great-grandson of the seventh Earl of Glasgow, Patrick Boyle had been an aide-de-camp to the Governor General of Canada between 1935 and 1937, but was killed in action during the Second World War; in 1948 his widow married Lieutenant-Colonel Charles Murray Floyd, OBE, FLS, FRICS (1905–1971), the chairman of Avon India Rubber and George Spencer Moulton Ltd (1955–68) and the son of Captain Sir Henry Robert Peel Floyd, 4th Baronet.

Simon Boyle was educated at Eton College, and then worked for Stewarts & Lloyds in Australia and the United Kingdom from 1959 to 1965. He joined Avon Rubber Company in 1966, but left to work for British Steel in 1970, remaining with them (largely at Llanwern, Gwent) until his retirement in 2001. In 1993, he was High Sheriff of Gwent, and he was appointed a Deputy Lieutenant for Gwent in 1997, before becoming the county's Lord Lieutenant in 2001 (serving until 2016); he was also appointed Justice of the Peace and a Companion of the Order of St John in 2002. He served as Chairman of Gwent Criminal Justice Board from 2003 to 2005 and as President of the Gwent Association of Voluntary Organisations from 2006 to 2016. In 2015, Boyle was appointed a Knight Commander of the Royal Victorian Order (KCVO).

In 1970, Boyle married Catriona, daughter of William Gordon Gordon of Lude, DFC, TD; they have had four children: Alice Catriona Jane (born 1972), Mary Helen Fenella (born 1974), Susannah Elizabeth (born 1977), and Christian Laura Frances (born 1982), and he had eight grand-children, Rosie, Flora, Katherine, George, Annabel, Hugo, Elizabeth and Susannah.

He died on 4 September 2020 at the age of 79.

Other offices
Preceded by C. A. Harding-Rolls	High Sheriff of Gwent; 1993	Succeeded by S. A. J. P. Bosanquet
Preceded by Sir Richard Hanbury-Tenison	Lord Lieutenant of Gwent; 2001–2016	Succeeded by Brigadier Robert Aitken
