= Henry Floyd =

Henry Floyd may refer to:

- Henry Floyd (Jesuit) (1563–1641), English Catholic priest
- Sir Henry Floyd, 5th Baronet (1899–1968), British Second World War general
- Henry F. Floyd (born 1947), U.S. federal judge
- Henry Floyd (cricketer) (1793–1868), English cricketer
- Sir Henry Floyd, 2nd Baronet (1793–1868), of the Floyd baronets
- Sir Henry Robert Peel Floyd, 4th Baronet (1855–1915), of the Floyd baronets
