= William Badcock =

William Badcock may refer to:

- William Badcock (goldsmith) (1622–1698), British goldsmith
- William Stanhope Badcock (1788–1859), admiral in the British Royal Navy
