= Henry Aubrey-Fletcher =

Henry Aubrey-Fletcher may refer to:

- Sir Henry Aubrey-Fletcher, 4th Baronet (1835–1910), British member of parliament
- Sir Henry Aubrey-Fletcher, 8th Baronet (born 1945), Lord Lieutenant of Buckinghamshire.
- Sir Henry Aubrey-Fletcher, 6th Baronet (1887–1969), Lord Lieutenant of Buckinghamshire and author of detective novels
