= A Dying Fall =

1955 novel by Henry Wade

- First edition
- Author: Henry Wade
- Language: English
- Genre: Detective
- Publisher: Constable
- Publication date: 1955
- Publication place: United Kingdom
- Media type: Print

A Dying Fall is a 1955 mystery detective novel by the British writer Henry Wade. It was the penultimate novel by Wade, one of the leading writers of the Golden Age of Detective Fiction. It was followed by his final novel The Litmore Snatch two years later.

== Synopsis ==
Captain Charles Rathlyn, a racehorse trainer stakes everything he has on his best horse for a major race and loses. He is employed by Kate Wyngold the owner of the winning horse to manage her stables. They marry but his heart is not in the relationship, particularly after he meets and falls in love with another woman. When Kate Wyngold then falls to her death, suspicion points towards him.

== Bibliography ==
- Magill, Frank Northen . Critical Survey of Mystery and Detective Fiction: Authors, Volume 4. Salem Press, 1988.
- Reilly, John M. Twentieth Century Crime & Mystery Writers. Springer, 2015.
