= Lovett baronets =

Title

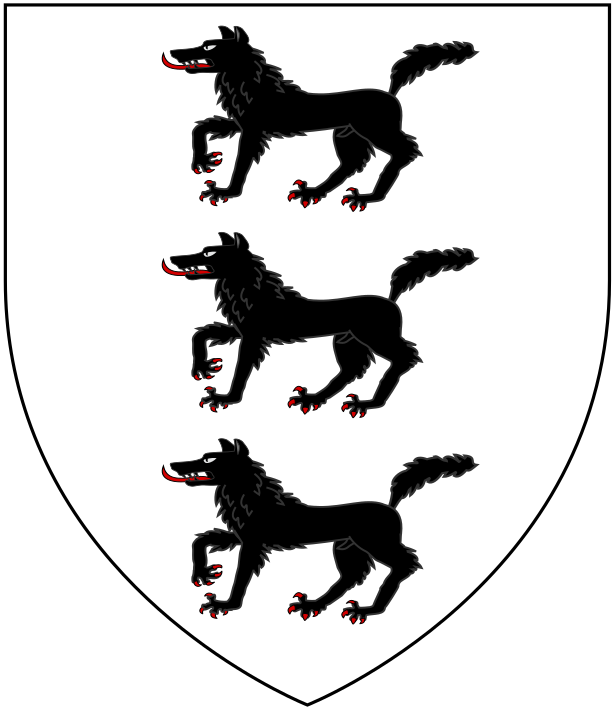
Arms of Lovett: Argent, three wolves passant in pale sable

Portrait of Sir Robert Lovett (d.1643), Knight, of Liscombe, Sheriff of Buckinghamshire in 1608, by a follower of Sir Anthony van Dyck

The Lovett Baronetcy, of Liscombe House in the County of Buckingham, was a title in the Baronetage of Great Britain. It was created on 23 October 1781 for Jonathan Lovett of Liscombe in the parish of Soulbury, Buckinghamshire. He was subsequently offered a peerage but declined, on the grounds that his only son had died. Lovett married Sarah Darby (daughter of Jonathan Darby of Leap Castle), but died in 1812 without surviving male issue, his son Robert Turville Jonathan Lovett having pre-deceseased him in 1807, and thus the title became extinct.

A new patent of the baronetcy was gazetted in 1808, with remainder to the first Baronet's daughters and their male issue. However, it is unclear whether this creation passed the Great Seal.

== Ancestry ==
Sir Robert Lovett (d.1643), Knight, of Liscombe, Buckinghamshire, Sheriff of Buckinghamshire in 1608, was the father of Anne Lovett, second wife of Edward Bourchier, 4th Earl of Bath (1590-1636) of Tawstock Court, Devon. Various monuments to the Lovett family survive in St Peter's Church, Tawstock. Arms of Lovett: Argent, three wolves passant in pale sable.

== Lovett Baronets, of Liscombe House (1781) ==
- Sir Jonathan Lovett, 1st Baronet (c. 1730–1812)

Baronetage of Great Britain
Preceded by Middleton baronets	Lovett baronets of Liscombe House; 23 October 1781	Succeeded by Turner baronets
