= Constable Guard Thyself =

1934 novel

- First edition
- Author: Henry Wade
- Language: English
- Series: Chief Inspector Poole
- Genre: Detective
- Publisher: Constable
- Publication date: 1934
- Publication place: United Kingdom
- Media type: Print
- Preceded by: No Friendly Drop
- Followed by: Bury Him Darkly

Constable Guard Thyself is a 1934 mystery detective novel by the British writer Henry Wade. It was the third in a series of seven novels featuring the character of Chief Inspector Poole, although it was preceded by the 1933 short story collection Policeman's Lot in which seven of the twelve stories had featured Poole. After his more experimental novel Mist on the Saltings Wade returned to the traditional detective model.

== Synopsis ==
When the Chief Constable of the rural county of Brodshire is found shot to death in his office, his acting replacement reluctantly calls in the assistance of Scotland Yard. Inspector Poole arrives to head the investigation in the face of hostility from the local police, a number of whom figure as prime suspects for the killing.

== Bibliography ==
- Herbert, Rosemary. Whodunit?: A Who's Who in Crime & Mystery Writing. Oxford University Press, 2003.
- Magill, Frank Northen . Critical Survey of Mystery and Detective Fiction: Authors, Volume 4. Salem Press, 1988.
- Reilly, John M. Twentieth Century Crime & Mystery Writers. Springer, 2015.
