= Bury Him Darkly =

1936 novel

- First edition
- Author: Henry Wade
- Language: English
- Series: Inspector Poole
- Genre: Detective
- Publisher: Constable
- Publication date: 1936
- Publication place: United Kingdom
- Media type: Print
- Preceded by: Constable Guard Thyself
- Followed by: Lonely Magdalen

Bury Him Darkly is a 1936 mystery detective novel by the British writer Henry Wade. It was the fourth in a series of seven novels featuring the character of Inspector Poole. Along with the following Poole novel, Lonely Magdalen, it marked a shift towards more realistic police procedurals that has been described as pioneering. Superintendent Fraser, who appeared in Wade's first novel The Verdict of You All, also appears as one of the characters.

== Synopsis ==
A robbery at a jewellers in Bond Street goes wrong, leaving a nightwatchman dead. Police follow up various lines of inquiry.

== Bibliography ==
- Herbert, Rosemary. Whodunit?: A Who's Who in Crime & Mystery Writing. Oxford University Press, 2003.
- Evans, Curtis. Masters of the "Humdrum" Mystery: Cecil John Charles Street, Freeman Wills Crofts, Alfred Walter Stewart and the British Detective Novel, 1920-1961. McFarland, 2014.
- Reilly, John M. Twentieth Century Crime & Mystery Writers. Springer, 2015.
