= Sir Henry Aubrey-Fletcher, 8th Baronet =

British baronet

Sir Henry Egerton Aubrey-Fletcher, 8th Baronet KCVO KStJ (born 27 November 1945), is the former Lord Lieutenant of Buckinghamshire. He is the grandson of Sir Henry Aubrey-Fletcher, who previously held the office from 1954 to 1961.

== Biography ==
The only son and second child of Lieut-Col Sir John Aubrey-Fletcher Bt JP and Diana Mary Fynvola Egerton, a scion of the Egertons of Tatton. Educated at Eton College, Sir Henry spent most of his career either farming or working in broadcasting. He worked on his father's farm until 1972 when he took over the tenancy. The same year he joined BBC Radio Oxford as a freelance presenter working shifts whenever they were available. In 1987 he joined the board of FOX FM, the company awarded the Independent Local Radio licence for Oxfordshire. With others, he went on to found another seven independent radio stations throughout central and southern England, retiring from the radio industry in 2006. He was Deputy Chairman of the National Trust 2002–05 and President of the Country Land and Business Association 2008–10.

Sir Henry and Lady Aubrey-Fletcher now run a number of companies in Buckinghamshire, including Chilton House Residential Home and the Chilton Business Centre.

After succeeding to the family baronetcy upon the death of his father in 1992, he then served as High Sheriff of Buckinghamshire for 1995–96. Sir Henry was admitted to the Freedom of the Haberdashers' Company in 1966.

Aubrey-Fletcher was Lord Lieutenant of Buckinghamshire between 2006 and June 2020; he was knighted as KCVO in the 2019 Birthday Honours.

== Marriage and children ==
In 1976, Aubrey-Fletcher married (Sara) Roberta Buchanan, younger daughter of Major Robert Buchanan TD, and with her, has three sons:

- John Robert Aubrey-Fletcher (born 20 June 1977)
- Thomas Egerton Aubrey-Fletcher (born 17 November 1980)
- Harry Buchanan Aubrey-Fletcher (born 29 March 1982); married in 2011 at Aldborough, North Yorkshire, the Hon (Sarah) Louise Stourton (born 28 February 1982), eldest daughter of Lord Mowbray, Segrave and Stourton. Harry Aubrey-Fletcher is a friend of Prince William, who, along with his then-fiancée, Catherine Middleton, attended his wedding. Harry Aubrey-Fletcher is also a godfather to Prince Louis of Wales.

== Arms ==
Coat of arms of Sir Henry Aubrey-Fletcher, 8th Baronet
Crest: 1. A horse's head argent charged with a trefoil gules (Fletcher); 2. An eagle's head erased or (Aubrey).; Escutcheon Quarterly: 1st and 4th, sable, a cross engrailed argent, between four plates, each charged with an arrow of the first (Fletcher), 2nd and 3rd, azure, a chevron between three eagle’s heads erased or (Aubrey) Motto Martis non Cupidinis (Belonging to Mars, not Cupid) Orders Royal Victorian Order - Knight Commander (KCVO)

== Additional sources ==
- thePeerage.com

Honorary titles
Preceded by John Michael Wheeler	High Sheriff of Buckinghamshire; 1995	Succeeded by Richard Morris-Adams
Preceded by Sir Nigel Mobbs	Lord Lieutenant of Buckinghamshire; 2006–2020	Succeeded by The Countess Howe
Baronetage of Great Britain
Preceded by Sir John Aubrey-Fletcher	Baronet (of Clea); 1992–present	Incumbent
