= Conn's =

Defunct American furniture, mattress, electronics and appliance store chain

Conn's, Inc.
- Company type: Public
- Traded as: Expert Market: CONNQ; Russell 2000 component
- Industry: Retail
- Founded: 1890; 136 years ago (as Eastham Plumbing and Heating Company); 1934; 92 years ago (as Conn's)
- Founder: Edward Eastham
- Defunct: October 31, 2024; 19 months ago
- Fate: Bankruptcy and liquidation amid further declining sales from Badcock acquisition
- Headquarters: The Woodlands, Texas, U.S.
- Number of locations: 146 (2021)
- Key people: Carol Washington Conn Sr. (namesake); Norm Miller (CEO)
- Products: Consumer electronics, Appliances and Furniture
- Revenue: ▼US$1.2 billion (2023)
- Operating income: ▼US$-125 million (2023)
- Net income: ▼US$-77 million (2023)
- Number of employees: 4,260 (Jan. 2021)
- Subsidiaries: Badcock Home Furniture &more (2023–2024)
- Website: conns.com

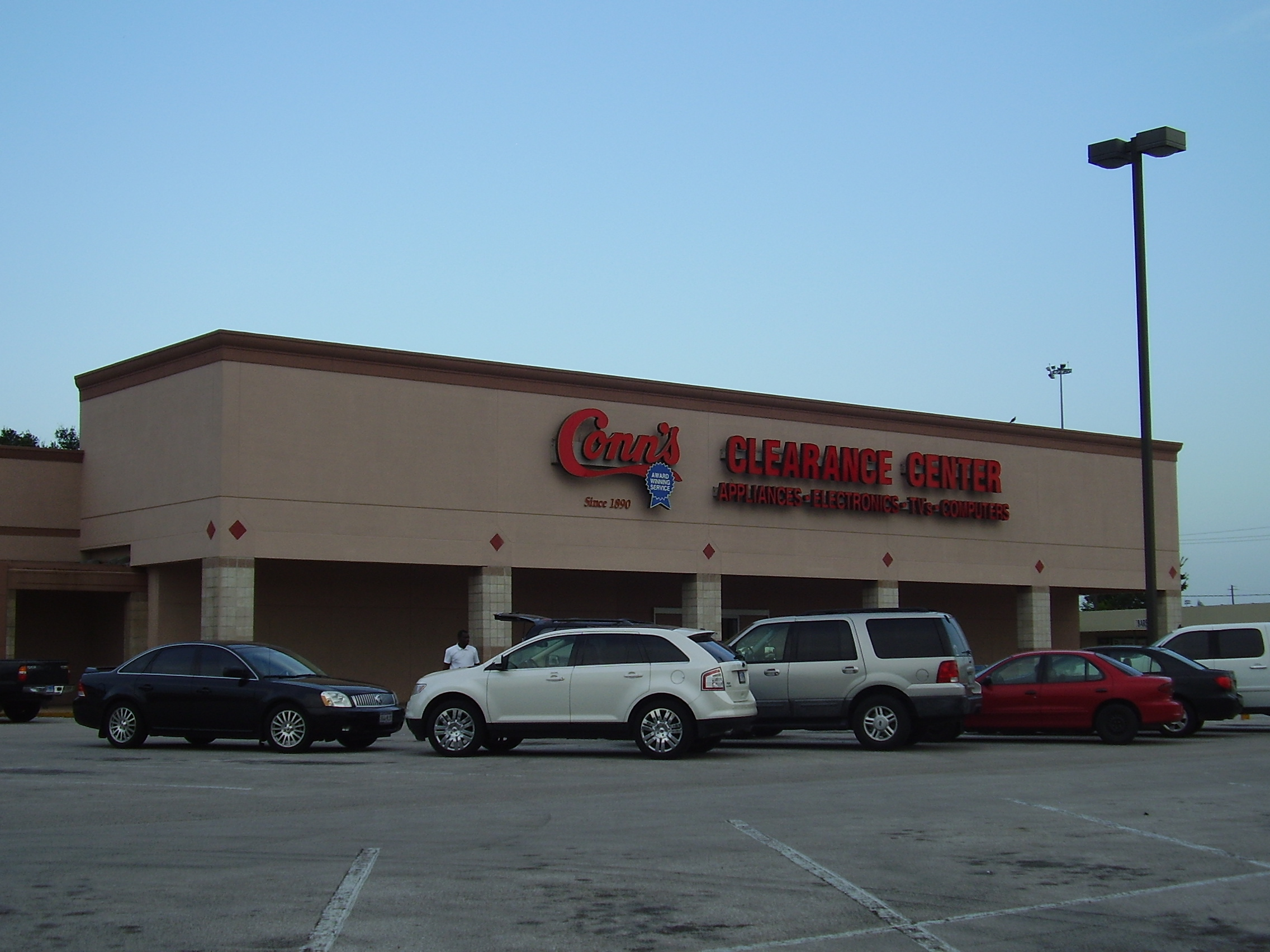
Conn's Clearance Center in Houston, TX.

Conn's, Inc. was an American furniture, mattress, electronics and appliance store chain headquartered in The Woodlands, Texas, United States. The chain had stores in Alabama, Arizona, Colorado, Georgia, Louisiana, Mississippi, Nevada, Florida, New Mexico, North Carolina, Oklahoma, South Carolina, Tennessee, Texas, and Virginia. Within Texas, Conn's had stores in Greater Houston, the Dallas/Fort Worth Metroplex, Greater San Antonio, Greater El Paso, Greater Corpus Christi, Southeast Texas, and South Texas.

== History ==
In 1890, Edward Eastham founded Eastham Plumbing and Heating Company in Beaumont, Texas. First National Bank of Beaumont took over the company and renamed it Plumbing and Heating, Inc. in 1931. Plumbing and Heating, Inc. hired Carol Washington Conn Sr. in 1933. He purchased the company one year later and changed the name to Conn Plumbing and Heating Company.

In 1937, Conn's began selling refrigerators and soon added gas ranges to its inventory. By 1940, Conn had purchased a store building and moved the company to 268 Pearl Street in Beaumont. The company's second store opened in 1959 on Eleventh Street in Beaumont. C.W. Conn Jr. joined the company in 1953 after serving in the Korean War. He recognized that customers needed dependable, quality service and founded Conn's retail service repair and maintenance subsidiary company, Appliance Parts and Service, in 1962. In 1964, he co-founded Conn Credit Corporation, a retail credit financing services company, to provide retail credit financing services to Conn's customers.

Carlton Russell Sr. was named president and chief operating officer in 1966 and served in those capacities until 1976. The Year 1966 found the company with four stores and a total sales volume of $4 million. Lake Charles, Louisiana was the site of Conn's first out-of-state store opened in 1969. A second out-of-state store was opened in Louisiana that same year, making it a landmark year. In 1975, Conn's opened more stores in Port Arthur, Orange and Baytown, Texas, as well as one in Lafayette, Louisiana. A second location in Lafayette and new stores in New Iberia and Opelousas, Louisiana soon followed. Conn Sr. died in 1975 and Carlton Russell Jr. became chairman of the board.

Under Conn Jr.'s direction, Conn's first location in Houston was opened in 1983, with many others to follow in subsequent years. In 1993, Conn's experienced its first $100 million sales volume year and opened its first San Antonio location. Thomas Frank Sr. became chairman of the board of Conn's in 1994. Under Frank's leadership, the company continued its growth trend and established itself as a major player in the retail sales industry as total sales volume grew to more than $200 million in 1997. In July, 1998, the company reorganized and brought in a new financial partner, The Stephens Group, Inc. Conn's market reach was broadened in 1999, when it opened its first store in Baton Rouge, Louisiana, and again in 2001, 2002 and 2003 when it opened its first stores in Austin, Corpus Christi, and in the Dallas-Ft. Worth Metroplex, respectively. In 2012, Conn's expanded into Arizona with a location in Tucson, and later in July, they expanded to the Phoenix area with the opened a location in Mesa. In 2014, they welcomed new states as Colorado, Tennessee, South Carolina and Mississippi. The company had 125 retail locations ranging in a variety of states coast to coast.

By the 2000s the chain, historically based in Beaumont, expanded.

Conn's, Inc. became a publicly traded company on November 25, 2003, when it sold 4.6 million shares in its initial public offering. The company's shares were traded on the NASDAQ Exchange under the symbol CONN. Today, in addition to appliances, electronics, furniture and mattresses, the company offers its customers service, distribution, financing, insurance, and other related services.

In December 2023, Conn's acquired Badcock Home Furniture & More from the Franchise Group, bringing the overall store count to around 500 stores from both brands.

In July 2024, Conn's warned that it may file for Chapter 11 bankruptcy protection within the coming weeks, blaming inflation, and a decline in sales as part of the decision. The company also blamed its purchase in Badcock as a result of mass losses and struggles. On July 23, 2024, Conn's announced that it would close up to 106 stores across the Conn's and Badcock brands. 71 Conn's stores and 35 Badcock stores are set to close by the end of summer 2024. That same day, Conn's filed for Chapter 11 bankruptcy protection in Texas, listing assets and liabilities of between $1 billion to $10 billion. The next day, on July 24, 2024, it was reported that Conn's was in the process of winding down and closing all of its nearly 600 Conn's and Badcock locations, with liquidation sales expected to be complete by October 31, 2024. On August 1, 2024, Conn's received a notice from Nasdaq, stating that their stock will be delisted from the Nasdaq on August 6, 2024. Shortly before October 31, 2024, all Conn’s and Badcock stores were permanently closed.

== Customer service scandal ==
On July 3, 2014, Conn's was featured in The New York Times in the biweekly column called "The Haggler". The article sparked a social media backlash, concentrated around the hashtag "#talktothehaggler". A follow-up column, continuing the critique of the company's customer service, was printed on July 19. On November 9, 2014, the Haggler column reported that Conn's did not return inquiries about its alleged practices of offering credit to high-risk customers, a lawsuit over which is currently underway.

Haggler columnist David Segal reported as follows: "bonuses for the company's chief executive, Theodore M. Wright; its chief operating officer, Michael J. Poppe; and its chief financial officer, Brian E. Taylor — named defendants in the suit — were largely tied to the company's operating income. [Wright's] maximum bonus of $850,000 would be achieved if Conn's booked $165.8 million in operating income in 2014, according to the suit. The company came close, with $162 million. Mr. Wright took home a $820,000 bonus. The complaint also states that both he and Mr. Poppe also sold shares of Conn's in 2013, the period when the plaintiffs maintain that those shares were "artificially inflated." Mr. Wright had not sold any shares since 2007. In 2013, he sold enough to yield $1.9 million. Mr. Poppe cashed out $2.6 million the same year. In this way top executives at Conn's benefitted from the credit-for-all strategy, with big bonuses and well-timed stock sales.
