= Released for Death =

1938 novel

- First edition
- Author: Henry Wade
- Language: English
- Genre: Thriller
- Publisher: Constable
- Publication date: 1938
- Publication place: United Kingdom
- Media type: Print

Released for Death is a 1938 crime thriller novel by British writer, Henry Wade. Wade was a writer of the Golden Age of Detective Fiction, best known for his series featuring Inspector Poole. This was amongst a number of stand-alone novels he wrote. It has elements of an inverted detective story, rather than the traditional closed circle of suspects.

== Synopsis ==
Two convicts at Hadstone prison are approaching the end of their sentences. Shortly after their release, an ex-prison warder, with whom they had clashed is murdered, and all the evidence pointed to one of the men. The investigating detective, Constable Bragg begins to believe he may have been framed by his fellow convict.

== Bibliography ==
- Magill, Frank Northen . Critical Survey of Mystery and Detective Fiction: Authors, Volume 4. Salem Press, 1988.
- Reilly, John M. Twentieth Century Crime & Mystery Writers. Springer, 2015.
