= Nigel Mobbs =

English businessman (1937–2005)

Sir Gerald Nigel Mobbs
- Born: 22 September 1937
- Died: 21 October 2005 (aged 68)
- Occupation: businessman

Sir Gerald Nigel Mobbs KStJ JP (22 September 1937 – 21 October 2005) was a businessman who was Lord Lieutenant of Buckinghamshire between 1997 and 2005.

He was chairman of Slough Estates, a property firm founded by his grandfather, Noel Mobbs. He was the senior non-executive director of Barclays Bank from 1980 to 2003.

He was also the High Sheriff of Buckinghamshire from 1982 to 1983 and was a Knight of St John, a Justice of the Peace and was made a Knight Bachelor in the 1986 Birthday Honours. He was chairman of the council of the University of Buckingham between 1987 and 1998.

He married, in 1961, Jane Berry, who was a daughter of Lionel Berry, 2nd Viscount Kemsley; they had a son and two daughters. He died suddenly at the age of 68.

Honorary titles
Preceded by Dorrien Belson	High Sheriff of Buckinghamshire; 1982	Succeeded by Edna Embleton
Preceded by The Lord Cottesloe	Lord Lieutenant of Buckinghamshire; 1997–2005	Succeeded by Sir Henry Aubrey-Fletcher, Bt
