= Samuel Sandars =

Samuel Sandars (25 April 1837, Chelmsford, Essex - 15 June 1894) was an English bibliographer, barrister and university benefactor.

He was educated at Harrow and Trinity College, Cambridge, where he took his BA degree in 1860 and became MA in 1863. Admitted to the Inner Temple in 1859, Sandars was called to the Bar in 1863. In July 1863 Sandars married Elizabeth Maria, eldest daughter of Francis William Russell, MP for Limerick.

Sandars was a Fellow of the Royal Geographical Society, a Fellow of the Royal Historical Society, a member of the Library Association and a member of the Bibliographical Society. He became JP for Buckinghamshire, and shortly before his death in 1894 High Sheriff of Buckinghamshire.

From 1869 onwards Sandars donated rare books to Cambridge University Library; he bequeathed 1,460 printed books to the library on his death. He was also a benefactor to the Fitzwilliam Museum, Great St Mary's Church and the Divinity School in Cambridge. Nigel Morgan lectured on "Sandars as a collector of illuminated manuscripts" as the 2014 Sandars Lecturer.

Sandars bequeathed £2000 to Cambridge University to endow the Sandars Readership in Bibliography for the delivery of one or more lectures annually on "Bibliography, Palaeography, Typography, Bookbinding, Book Illustration, the science of Books and Manuscripts and the Arts relating thereto." A checklist of the Sandars Lectures from 1894 to 1983 by David McKitterick was published in 1983.

Honorary titles
Preceded by Stafford O'Brien Hoare	High Sheriff of Buckinghamshire; 1894	Succeeded by Francis Culling Carr-Gomm
