= The Duke of York's Steps =

1929 novel

- First edition
- Author: Henry Wade
- Language: English
- Series: Chief Inspector Poole
- Genre: Detective
- Publisher: Constable
- Publication date: 1929
- Publication place: United Kingdom
- Media type: Print
- Followed by: No Friendly Drop

The Duke of York's Steps is a 1929 mystery detective novel by the British writer Henry Wade. It was the first in a series of seven novels featuring the character of Chief Inspector Poole, published during the Golden Age of Detective Fiction. The title refers to the steps that connect the Duke of York Column to The Mall in Central London. It is notable for its portrayal of a German Jewish character, a banker who seeks revenge for his mistreatment by murdering a fellow banker. It was well-received by critics and sold well. In The Observer the reviewer Gerald Gould wrote "It would be difficult to overpraise it".

== Synopsis ==
After banker Sir Garth Fratten is found dead near a London landmark, Poole of Scotland Yard leads the investigation. The victim has died apparently without human intervention.

== Bibliography ==
- Reilly, John M. Twentieth Century Crime & Mystery Writers. Springer, 2015.
- Turnbull, Malcolm J. Victims Or Villains: Jewish Images in Classic English Detective Fiction. Popular Press, 1998.
