= No Friendly Drop =

1931 novel

- First edition (UK)
- Author: Henry Wade
- Language: English
- Series: Inspector Poole
- Genre: Detective
- Publisher: Constable (UK); Brewer, Warren and Putnam (US)
- Publication date: 1931
- Publication place: United Kingdom
- Media type: Print
- Preceded by: The Duke of York's Steps
- Followed by: Constable Guard Thyself

No Friendly Drop is a 1931 mystery detective novel by the British writer Henry Wade. It was the second in a series of seven novels featuring the character of Inspector Poole, published during the Golden Age of Detective Fiction. It was released in the United States the following year by Brewer and Warren where it received positive reviews in the New York Herald Tribune and the New York Evening Post, with the latter describing it as "A superior detective story, depending more upon intrinsic interest in a logical plot than upon excitement and goriness for its hold on the reader".

== Synopsis ==
When Lord Henry Grayle is found dead in bed his country house it is at first assumed he committed suicide by taking an overdose of sleeping pills. However, a more detailed examination reveals traces of scopolamine in his body creating a fatal combination of the two drugs. Everyone who knew him claimed he was well-liked, so who could the poisoner be?

Called in to investigate from Scotland Yard, Inspector Poole is forced to tiptoe around the sensitives of the local police force, the deceased's grieving widow and the house's servants. His discovery that the family's married butler is leading a secret second life with a woman in another town, and the fact that the family's valuable antique furniture is being sent away for repair only to return as well-done copies further spurs his curiosity.

== Bibliography ==
- Herbert, Rosemary. Whodunit?: A Who's Who in Crime & Mystery Writing. Oxford University Press, 2003.
- Reilly, John M. Twentieth Century Crime & Mystery Writers. Springer, 2015.
