= Lonely Magdalen =

1940 novel

- First edition
- Author: Henry Wade
- Language: English
- Series: Inspector Poole
- Genre: Detective
- Publisher: Constable
- Publication date: 1940
- Publication place: United Kingdom
- Media type: Print
- Preceded by: Bury Him Darkly
- Followed by: Too Soon to Die

Lonely Magdalen is a 1940 mystery detective novel by the British writer Henry Wade. It was the fifth in a series of seven novels featuring the character of Inspector Poole, published during the Golden Age of Detective Fiction. The book focuses more closely on police procedural than the traditional puzzle format. There was a thirteen-year gap between this and the next entry in the series Too Soon to Die.

== Synopsis ==
A woman is found strangled on a corner of London's Hampstead Heath, who proves to be a prostitute from Kentish Town. The investigations of Inspector Poole, however, reveal that she had once been from a respectable background. He deduces the culprit is like to be drawn from one her clients.

== Bibliography ==
- Evans, Curtis. Masters of the "Humdrum" Mystery: Cecil John Charles Street, Freeman Wills Crofts, Alfred Walter Stewart and the British Detective Novel, 1920-1961. McFarland, 2014.
- Herbert, Rosemary. Whodunit?: A Who's Who in Crime & Mystery Writing. Oxford University Press, 2003.
- Keating, Henry Reymond Fitzwalter. Whodunit?: A Guide to Crime, Suspense, and Spy Fiction. Van Nostrand Reinhold Company, 1982.
- Reilly, John M. Twentieth Century Crime & Mystery Writers. Springer, 2015.
