= The Hanging Captain =

1932 novel

- First edition
- Author: Henry Wade
- Language: English
- Genre: Detective
- Publisher: Constable
- Publication date: 1932
- Publication place: United Kingdom
- Media type: Print

The Hanging Captain is a 1932 mystery detective novel by the British writer Henry Wade. Wade was a writer of the Golden Age of Detective Fiction, best known for his series featuring Chief Inspector Poole. This was one of a number of stand-alone novels he wrote.

== Synopsis ==
When an ex-Army officer is found hanging in his house, it at first looks like suicide. However rival investigations by Inspector Lott of Scotland Yard and Superintendent Dawle of the local county constabulary demonstrate it is in fact murder and a hunt begins for the culprit.

== Bibliography ==
- Magill, Frank Northen . Critical Survey of Mystery and Detective Fiction: Authors, Volume 4. Salem Press, 1988.
- Reilly, John M. Twentieth Century Crime & Mystery Writers. Springer, 2015.
