= Diplomat's Folly =

1951 novel

Diplomat’s Folly
- First edition
- Author: Henry Wade
- Language: English
- Genre: Thriller
- Publisher: Constable
- Publication date: 1951
- Publication place: United Kingdom
- Media type: Print

Diplomat’s Folly is a 1951 thriller mystery novel by the British writer Henry Wade. Wade was a key writer during the Golden Age of Detective Fiction. The plot follows a traditional Country House mystery formula following a murder.

== Synopsis ==
While working at the British Embassy in Paris, a promising diplomat had a relationship with an attractive Frenchwoman. His indiscreetness led to information about the upcoming visit of the King to Paris, potentially putting the monarch's life in danger. Some time later her brother blackmails him with the letters. He enlists an old friend to help him.

== Bibliography ==
- Reilly, John M. Twentieth Century Crime & Mystery Writers. Springer, 2015.
