= Humphrey Senhouse =

Humphrey Senhouse may refer to:

- Humphrey Senhouse (port founder) (1705–1770), landowner and founder of the port of Maryport
- Humphrey Senhouse (politician) (1731–1814), British Tory politician and Member of Partiament for Cockermouth and Cumberland
- Humphrey Fleming Senhouse (1781–1841), British naval officer
