= Gold Was Our Grave =

1954 novel

- First US edition
- Author: Henry Wade
- Language: English
- Series: Inspector Poole
- Genre: Detective
- Publisher: Constable (UK); Macmillan Inc. (US)
- Publication date: 1954
- Publication place: United Kingdom
- Media type: Print
- Preceded by: Too Soon to Die

Gold Was Our Grave is a 1954 mystery detective novel by the British writer Henry Wade. It was the seventh and last in a series of novels featuring the character of Inspector Poole, published during the Golden Age of Detective Fiction.

== Synopsis ==
After Hector Berrenton narrowly survives a car accident, he returns home to find a threatening note. It seems likely that someone has tampered with his car, seeking revenge for his involvement in a Bolivian goldmining concern that left many investors ruined several years earlier.

== Bibliography ==
- Bargainnier, Earl F. & Dove George N. Cops and Constables: American and British Fictional Policemen. Popular Press, 1986.
- Herbert, Rosemary. Whodunit?: A Who's Who in Crime & Mystery Writing. Oxford University Press, 2003.
- Reilly, John M. Twentieth Century Crime & Mystery Writers. Springer, 2015.
