= The Missing Partners =

1928 novel

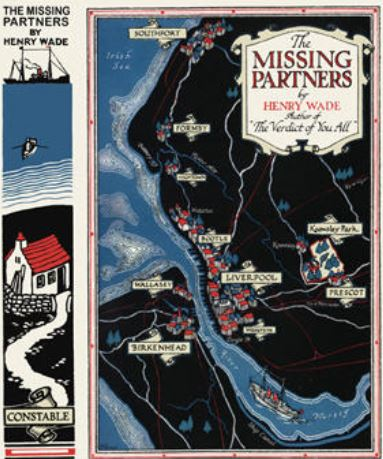
- First edition (UK)
- Author: Henry Wade
- Language: English
- Genre: Detective
- Publisher: Constable (UK); Payson and Clarke (US)
- Publication date: 1928
- Publication place: United Kingdom
- Media type: Print

The Missing Partners is a 1928 mystery detective novel by the British writer Henry Wade. It was his second novel following his successful debut The Verdict of You All in 1926.

== Synopsis ==
James and Charles Morden, cousins and partners in a Liverpool shipping company, both disappear at the same time. When James turns up dead on a mudflat the investigating officer Superintendent Dodd concludes that it was his cousin who killed him and fled to America. However, two of the other employees of the company are not convinced and launch their own attempt to solve the case.

== Bibliography ==
- Herbert, Rosemary. Whodunit?: A Who's Who in Crime & Mystery Writing. Oxford University Press, 2003.
- Magill, Frank Northern. Critical Survey of Mystery and Detective Fiction: Authors, Volume 4. Salem Press, 1988.
- Reilly, John M. Twentieth Century Crime & Mystery Writers. Springer, 2015.
