= Elizabeth Curzon, Countess Howe =

British ceremonial officer (born 1955)

The Right Honourable The Countess Howe DStJ

Lord-Lieutenant of Buckinghamshire
- Incumbent
- Assumed office 27 November 2020
- Monarchs: Elizabeth II; Charles III
- Preceded by: Sir Henry Aubrey-Fletcher

Personal details
- Born: Elizabeth Helen Stuart; 12 November 1955 (age 70)
- Spouse: Frederick Curzon, 7th Earl Howe (m. 1983)
- Children: 4
- Education: Headington School
- Alma mater: University of Cambridge (BEd)

Elizabeth Helen Curzon, Countess Howe (née Stuart; born 12 November 1955) is a British peeress, educator and philanthropist who has served as Lord-Lieutenant of Buckinghamshire since 27 November 2020.

== Early life and education ==
Lady Howe was born Elizabeth Helen Stuart, on 12 November 1955, to Burleigh Edward St Lawrence Stuart (1920–2004) and Joan Elizabeth Platts (died 2001). She was raised in Buckinghamshire and was educated at Headington School in Oxford. She obtained a Bachelor of Education from the University of Cambridge.

== Career ==
After completing university, Lady Howe began teaching in Newmarket and in London at Dulwich College Preparatory School. She has worked as a governor and volunteer music teachers in schools in Buckinghamshire.

In 1995, Lady Howe was made a deputy lieutenant of Buckinghamshire. She served as High Sheriff of Buckinghamshire from 2010 to 2011. She was appointed Lord-Lieutenant of Buckinghamshire on 26 June 2020. She took office upon the retirement of Sir Henry Aubrey-Fletcher, 8th Baronet, on 27 November 2020. She is the first woman to hold the position, which was established in 1535 by King Henry VIII.

Lady Howe holds a number positions in local charitable organizations. She is chairman of Heart of Bucks Community Foundation, patron of Milton Keynes Islamic Art, Heritage and Culture, and president of the Epilepsy Society.

In 2023, as lord-lieutenant, Lady Howe attended the coronation of King Charles III with her husband.

== Marriage and family ==
On 26 March 1983, Elizabeth Stuart married Frederick Curzon. The following year, Curzon succeeded his second cousin as 7th Earl Howe, thus making his wife Countess Howe.

The Earl and Countess have four children: Lady Anna Curzon (born 19 January 1987); Lady Flora Curzon (born 12 June 1989); Lady Lucinda Curzon (born 12 October 1991); and Thomas, Viscount Curzon (born 22 October 1994). The family resides at Penn House in Penn, Buckinghamshire.

== Honours ==
- Most Venerable Order of the Hospital of Saint John of Jerusalem:
  - 5 July 1990: Serving Sister (now Member) (SStJ)
  - 15 July 1997: Officer (Sister) (OStJ)
  - 18 April 2017: Commander (Sister) (CStJ)
  - 21 April 2026: Dame (DStJ)
- 6 May 2023: King Charles III Coronation Medal

Honorary titles
Preceded by Allan Westray	High Sheriff of Buckinghamshire; 2010–2011	Succeeded by James Naylor
Preceded by Sir Henry Aubrey-Fletcher	Lord-Lieutenant of Buckinghamshire; 2020–present	Incumbent
