= Be Kind to the Killer =

1952 novel

- First edition
- Author: Henry Wade
- Language: English
- Genre: Detective
- Publisher: Constable
- Publication date: 1952
- Publication place: United Kingdom
- Media type: Print

Be Kind to the Killer is a 1952 detective novel by the British writer Henry Wade. As with many of his works it is written in the style of a police procedural.

A review by Julian Symons in the Times Literary Supplement observed that "Mr. Wade’s writing is pedestrian and at times faintly comic" although concluded "But Be Kind to the Killer is a sound piece of work, which contains some interesting details of police procedure."

== Synopsis ==
When his childhood friend and fellow police officer is killed on duty, Detective Constable Henry Campion takes it on his own shoulders to singlehandedly bring those responsible to justice.

== Bibliography ==
- Magill, Frank Northen . Critical Survey of Mystery and Detective Fiction: Authors, Volume 4. Salem Press, 1988.
- Nevins, Francis M. The Mystery Writer's Art. Bowling Green University Popular Press, 1971.
- Reilly, John M. Twentieth Century Crime & Mystery Writers. Springer, 2015.
