= Henry John Cumming =

British Army officer

General Sir Henry John Cumming KCH
- Born: December 1771; Calcutta, Bengal
- Died: 28 November 1856 (aged 84)
- Burial place: Kensal Green Cemetery
- Military career
- Allegiance: United Kingdom
- Branch: British Army
- Service years: 1790–1842
- Rank: General
- Conflicts: Napoleonic Wars
- Awards: KCH
- Other work: Colonel of the 12th Lancers

General Sir Henry John Cumming, KCH (December 1771 – 28 November 1856) was a senior officer in the British Army.

He was born in Calcutta, the son of Col. Sir John Cumming of the East India Company.

He joined the Army in 1790 as a cornet in the 11th Dragoons, rising to the rank of Major in 1798. He served in Flanders from 1793 to 1795, taking part in every battle during that period (Valencienne, Dunkirk and le Cateau). After fighting with distinction at Den Helder in Holland in 1799 he was promoted Lieutenant-Colonel in 1803. From 1811 to 1813 he was engaged in the Peninsular War where he received a sabre wound at the Battle of El Bodón but nevertheless took part in the later Battles of Castrejon, Salamanca, Venta del Pozo and Morales.

He was awarded KCH and, in 1833, was knighted. He was given the colonelcy for life of the 12th Lancers in 1837 and retired in 1842. He was promoted full General in 1846.

He died in 1856, aged 84, and was buried in Kensal Green Cemetery. His son was Admiral Sir Arthur Cumming, RN.

Military offices
Preceded by Sir Hussey Vivian	Colonel of the 12th (The Prince of Wales's); Royal Regiment of (Light) Dragoons (Lancers); 1837–1856	Succeeded by Sir Lovell Benjamin Lovell
