= John Darling Young =

British Lord Lieutenant of Buckinghamshire

Major John Darling Young, JP (1910 – 1988) was Lord Lieutenant of Buckinghamshire from 1969 to 1984. His parents were Frederick William Young and Florence Darling.

He served in the Second World War with the Life Guards.

In addition to the Lord Lieutenancy, he also served as High Sheriff of Buckinghamshire for 1960, and as a member of Buckinghamshire County Council for Buckingham.

Honorary titles
Preceded by Cyril Cobham Griffith	High Sheriff of Buckinghamshire; 1960–1961	Succeeded by Sir John Aubrey-Fletcher, Bt
Preceded by Sir Henry Floyd, Bt	Lord Lieutenant of Buckinghamshire; 1969–1984	Succeeded by The Lord Cottesloe
