= Too Soon to Die =

1953 novel

- First edition (UK)
- Author: Henry Wade
- Language: English
- Series: Inspector Poole
- Genre: Detective
- Publisher: Constable (UK); Macmillan Inc. (US)
- Publication date: 1953
- Publication place: United Kingdom
- Media type: Print
- Preceded by: Lonely Magdalen
- Followed by: Gold Was Our Grave

Too Soon to Die is a 1953 mystery detective novel by the British writer Henry Wade. It was the sixth in a series of seven novels featuring the character of Inspector Poole, published during the Golden Age of Detective Fiction. It followed a thirteen year gap since the publication of the previous novel Lonely Magdalen.

== Synopsis ==
Colonel Jerrod and his son concoct an ingenious plan as part of an attempt to save their country estate from crippling death duties. After an apparent boating accident the Inland Revenue investigate before Poole, now a Chief Inspector, arrives on the scene

== Bibliography ==
- Herbert, Rosemary. Whodunit?: A Who's Who in Crime & Mystery Writing. Oxford University Press, 2003.
- Reilly, John M. Twentieth Century Crime & Mystery Writers. Springer, 2015.
