= Lord Lieutenant of Gwent =

Welsh county ceremonial officer

The office of Lord Lieutenant of Gwent was created on 1 April 1974 as the monarch's representative covering the newly formed administrative county of Gwent. By virtue of S.I 1973/1754, the existing Lord Lieutenant of Monmouthshire became the first Lord Lieutenant of Gwent.

Following the abolition of Gwent in 1996 by the Local Government (Wales) Act 1994, the area was redefined as a preserved county. This was subsequently modified to its present area by S.I 2003/974.

== Lord Lieutenants of Gwent ==
- Before 1974 – see Lord Lieutenant of Monmouthshire
- Col. Edward Roderick Hill – from 1 April 1974
- Sir Richard Hanbury-Tenison, of Clytha Park – 25 June 1979 to 22 October 2001
- Sir Simon Boyle – 22 October 2001 to 23 March 2016
- Brigadier Robert Aitken – since 24 March 2016
