= John Aubrey-Fletcher =

British baronet, cricketer, and soldier

Lieutenant-Colonel Sir John Henry Lancelot Aubrey-Fletcher, 7th Baronet (22 August 1912 – 19 June 1992) was a British baronet, who played first-class cricket for Oxford and was a British Army soldier.

Born in Kensington, Aubrey-Fletcher was the eldest son of Sir Henry Lancelot Aubrey-Fletcher, 6th Baronet and his wife Mary Augusta Chilton.

He was educated at Eton College and at New College, Oxford. While at Oxford in 1933 he played cricket for the university team. In 1937 he was accepted at Inner Temple entitled to practice as Barrister-at-Law. He played Minor counties cricket between 1931 and 1948 for Buckinghamshire.

In 1939 he married Diana Mary Fynvola Egerton (the great-granddaughter of the second Baron Harlech) and they had two children:

- Susan Mary Fynvola Aubrey-Fletcher (1940–1976), who was married, without issue, to Hon. Richard Stanley, brother and heir presumptive of the Earl of Derby
- Henry Egerton Aubrey-Fletcher, born 1945

During the Second World War he fought in the Grenadier Guards, attaining the rank of lieutenant colonel.

From 1961 to 1962 he held the office of High Sheriff of Buckinghamshire. He died in 1992 at Oxford.

== Arms ==
Coat of arms of John Aubrey-Fletcher
Crest: 1. A horse's head argent charged with a trefoil gules (Fletcher); 2. An eagle's head erased or (Aubrey).; Escutcheon Quarterly: 1st and 4th, sable, a cross engrailed argent, between four plates, each charged with an arrow of the first (Fletcher), 2nd and 3rd, azure, a chevron between three eagle’s heads erased or (Aubrey) Motto Martis non Cupidinis (Belonging to Mars, not Cupid)

Honorary titles
Preceded by John Darling Young	High Sheriff of Buckinghamshire; 1961–1962	Succeeded by Gerald Aubrey Mobbs
Baronetage of Great Britain
Preceded by Henry Aubrey-Fletcher	Baronet (of Clea); 1969–1992	Succeeded by Henry Aubrey-Fletcher
