= The High Sheriff =

1937 novel

- First edition (UK)
- Author: Henry Wade
- Language: English
- Genre: Detective
- Publisher: Constable
- Publication date: 1937
- Publication place: United Kingdom
- Media type: Print

The High Sheriff is a 1937 mystery detective novel by the British writer Henry Wade. Wade was a writer of the Golden Age of Detective Fiction, best known for his series featuring Inspector Poole. This was one of a number of stand-alone novels he wrote, structured as a partially inverted detective story.

== Reception ==
Cecil Day-Lewis writing in The Spectator under his pen name Nicholas Blake noted in his review that the author "turns from pure detection to the novel of character with a crime motif. The turn, to my mind, is not for the better: but that may be because I don’t care for hunting and shooting, which play a large part in the book, and because I found the hero, Sir Robert D’Arcy, rather a stick." A more favourable review was written by Sir Claud Schuster in the Times Literary Supplement.

== Synopsis ==
Sir Robert D’Arcy, the high sheriff of Brackenshire is blackmailed by a man who knows of his act of cowardice against the Germans during the First World War. D’Arcy, a proud and arrogant man from a leading family of the county can't bear the potential slur against his name. When the blackmailer is shot dead during a shooting party at D’Arcy's country house, suspicion inevitably falls on him.

== Bibliography ==
- Magill, Frank Northen . Critical Survey of Mystery and Detective Fiction: Authors, Volume 4. Salem Press, 1988.
- Reilly, John M. Twentieth Century Crime & Mystery Writers. Springer, 2015.
