= Turner baronets of Kirkleatham (1782) =

Escutcheon of the Turner baronets of Kirkleatham

The Turner baronetcy, of Kirkleatham in the County of York, was created in the Baronetage of Great Britain on 8 May 1782 for Charles Turner, Member of Parliament for York, from 1768 to 1783.

The 2nd Baronet was Member of Parliament for Kingston upon Hull from 1796 to 1802. The title became extinct on his death in 1810.

== Turner baronets, of Kirkleatham (1782) ==
- Sir Charles Turner, 1st Baronet (c. 1727–1783)
- Sir Charles Turner, 2nd Baronet (1773–1810)

== Notes ==
Baronetage of Great Britain
Preceded by Lovett baronets	Turner baronets of Kirkleatham; 20 May 1782	Succeeded by Fletcher baronets
