= Heir Presumptive (novel) =

1935 novel

- First edition
- Author: Henry Wade
- Language: English
- Genre: Detective
- Publisher: Constable
- Publication date: 1935
- Publication place: United Kingdom
- Media type: Print

Heir Presumptive is a 1935 mystery crime novel by the British writer Henry Wade. It is largely an inverted detective story which reveals the killer early but also features a murder in which he is beaten to it by someone else, with numerous potential suspects.

== Synopsis ==
Following news of an accident on the senior branch of a titled and very wealthy family, Eustace Hendel the head of the junior branch realises that he has now moved much closer to inheriting. Struggling financially and in love with an ambitious woman, he chooses to eliminate the remaining relatives who stand between him and the family fortune and a seat in the House of Lords.

== Bibliography ==
- Evans, Curtis. Masters of the "Humdrum" Mystery: Cecil John Charles Street, Freeman Wills Crofts, Alfred Walter Stewart and the British Detective Novel, 1920-1961. McFarland, 2014.
- Reilly, John M. Twentieth Century Crime & Mystery Writers. Springer, 2015.
