= Charles Murray Floyd =

English businessman, land agent and local politician

Charles Murray Floyd (12 September 1905 – 27 June 1971) was an English businessman, surveyor, land agent and local politician.

== Biography ==
Charles Murray Floyd was born on 12 September 1905, the third and youngest son of Captain Sir Henry Robert Peel Floyd, 4th Baronet (1855–1915), a Royal Naval officer who fought in the East African Campaign of 1890 and the Second Boer War, and his wife Edith Anne Kincaid-Smith (died 1955), daughter of Major John Kincaid-Smith, of Polmont House, Stirlingshire, Scotland; the elder sons were Brigadier Sir Henry Robert Kincaid Floyd, who became 5th Baronet, and Sir John Duckett Floyd, who succeeded him as 6th Baronet.

Charles Floyd was educated at Eton College and Trinity College, Cambridge, graduating with a Bachelor of Arts (BA) degree in 1927. He was a partner in the surveyors and land agents company Powlett & Floyd of Bath from 1935 to 1955 and a Fellow of the Royal Institution of Chartered Surveyors, but his career was interrupted by service in the Second World War; he joined the British Expeditionary Force in France in 1939 and served with them until 1940. He was later attached to the 21st Army Group in the last two years of the war, rising to the rank of Lieutenant-Colonel and being appointed an Officer of the Order of the British Empire (OBE).

In 1955 he became chairman of Wiltshire-based Avon India Rubber Company Limited, which soon acquired its local rival George Spencer, Moulton Ltd; he retired from those posts in 1968.

Floyd was also keenly involved with land management and nature conservation; he was a member of the Forestry Commission's Committee for England from 1954 and was President of the Royal Forestry Society of England and Wales from 1954 to 1956; he was also a member of the Royal Commission on Common Land from 1955 to 1958 and a Fellow of the Linnean Society of London. He was involved in the Wiltshire Archaeological and Natural History Society and the Wiltshire Record Society, and was instrumental in the formation of the Wiltshire Trust for Nature Conservation (now Wiltshire Wildlife Trust) in 1962. He was Sheriff of Wiltshire for 1962–63 and councillor on Wiltshire County Council from 1965 till his death on 27 June 1971.

In 1948, Floyd married Mary Elizabeth Fleetwood Fuller, OBE, JP, DL (1916–1996), the daughter of Major Robert Fleetwood Fuller (1875–1955), JP, DL, of Great Chalfield, Melksham, Wiltshire (of which county he was High Sheriff in 1926), and the widow of Lieutenant-Colonel Patrick John Salvin Boyle (1910–1944). Floyd and his wife had three children: Robert Charles (born 1949), Thomas Henry Floyd (born 1951) and William Duckett (born 1956); the businessman Sir Simon Boyle was his stepson from Mary's first marriage.
