= Lovell Badcock =

Lovell Badcock (1744 - 1797) was High Sheriff of Buckinghamshire in the year 1795 and was a descendant of Sir Salathiel Lovell.

Badcock was Lieutenant-Colonel of the Buckinghamshire Militia when it was embodied in 1778 for home defence during the American war of Independence. He was also a Justice of the peace and Deputy Lieutenant for that county.

He died unmarried in 1797 aged fifty-three years and was buried in the church of Little Missenden. His estates of Little Missenden Abbey, Buckinghamshire and Maplethorpe Hall, Lincolnshire devolved on his brother, Thomas Stanhope Badcock, who was also later a High Sheriff of Buckingham.
