= Richard Hanbury-Tenison =

British diplomat (1925–2017)

Sir Richard Hanbury-Tenison, KCVO (3 January 1925 – 12 August 2017) was a Welsh-Irish diplomat, soldier and royal representative.

Born on 3 January 1925, he was the son of Major G. E. F. Tenison and Ruth, née Hanbury. His father was from Ireland, but his mother's family had made their wealth out of mining iron ore and processing it in Pontypool in Wales over two centuries earlier. Hanbury-Tenison attended Eton and then served as an officer in the Irish Guards from 1943, firstly in Belgium and the Netherlands in late 1944 and then in Germany in 1945, where he was wounded.

After studying at Magdalen College, Oxford, he entered HM Diplomatic Service in 1949. He was in Austria from 1956, dealing with the arrival of refugees from Hungary. He subsequently served in Romania and as political counsellor in Germany and Belgium. He left the service in 1975 and settled in the Welsh county of Gwent. There, he was closely involved with various public bodies. Having served as High Sheriff of the county in 1977, he was the Lord Lieutenant of Gwent from 1979 to 2000 and was appointed a Knight Commander of the Royal Victorian Order in the 1995 Birthday Honours. He died on 14 August 2017.
