= Bockmer End =

Hamlet in Buckinghamshire, England

Coordinates: 51.56°N 00.83°W

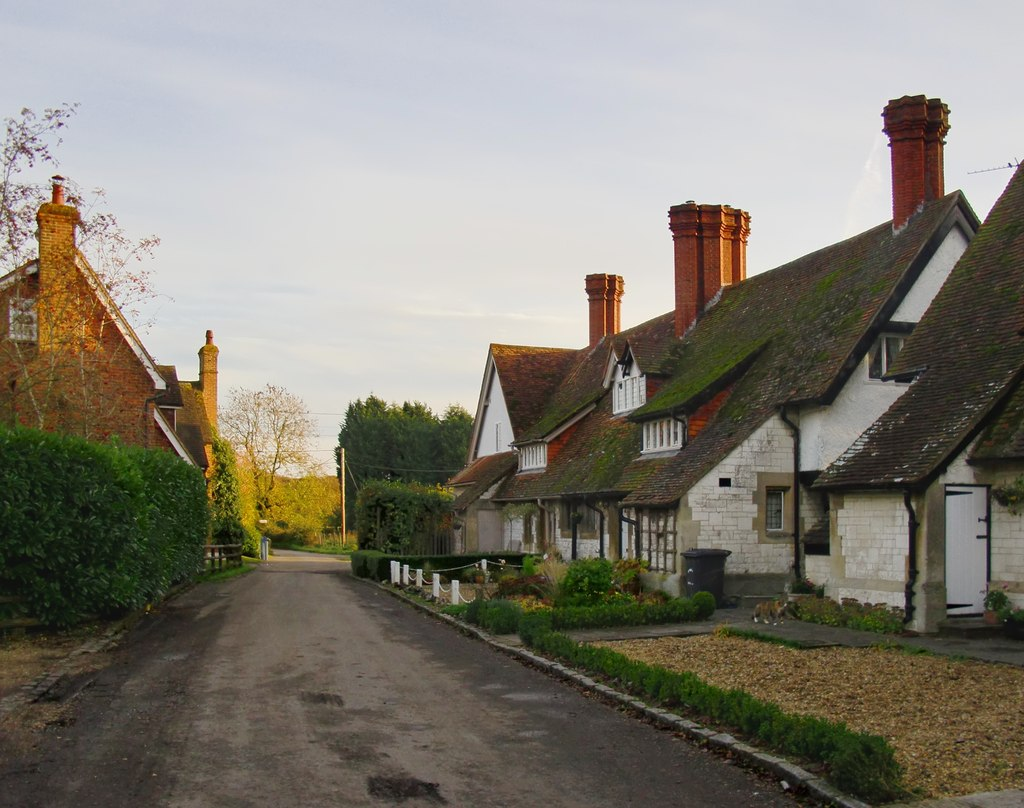

- Location within Buckinghamshire
- OS grid reference: SU8186
- Civil parish: Medmenham
- Unitary authority: Buckinghamshire
- Ceremonial county: Buckinghamshire
- Region: South East
- Country: England
- Sovereign state: United Kingdom
- Post town: marlow
- Postcode district: SL7
- Police: Thames Valley
- Fire: Buckinghamshire
- Ambulance: South Central

Bockmer End is a hamlet in the civil parish of Medmenham to the west of Marlow in Buckinghamshire, England. It is in the town of Marlow.
