= Jack Badcock (naturalist) =

English naturalist (1900–1982)

Jack Clement Badcock (9 July 1900 – 13 June 1982) was an English historian, naturalist, writer, and painter who lived in the village of Fleckney, Leicestershire.

From 1955 to 1975, Badcock wrote a regular naturalist column titled "Nature Notes" for the Leicester Mercury and also produced a number of books on the subject, including In the Countryside of South Leicestershire (1972) and A Countryman's Calendar (1973).

Badcock was also the first person to write a history of the village of Fleckney in 1951, and also wrote a fictional trilogy of books with a rustic theme entitled, The Truants (1953), Waybent (1954') and The Four-Acre (1967).

Due to the lengthy incumbency of the Reverend Thomas Badcock at Fleckney Parish Church in the nineteenth century, there has been an assumption that the two were related, though in fact, they were from entirely different families.

In recent times, Badcock has been commemorated in his native village, with the naming of 'Badcock Way', at the entrance to the Saddington Grange Estate, on Saddington Road.
