= Catherine Lintot =

British legal printer (1733–1816)

Lady Catherine Fletcher
- Born: Catherine Lintot; 1733; Temple Bar, London
- Died: 17 October 1816 (aged 82–83); Ashley Park
- Burial place: Walton-on-Thames
- Monuments: Walton-on-Thames
- Occupation: printer
- Spouse: Sir Henry Fletcher, 1st Baronet, of Clea Hall
- Relatives: Barnaby Bernard Lintot (grandfather)

Catherine Lintot (1733–1816), later Catherine Fletcher, Lady Fletcher, born by Temple Bar, London, was an English printer. She was the only surviving child of Henry (1703–1758) and Elizabeth Lintot (née Aubrey, died 1734).

== Life ==
Lintot was born in 1733 in Temple Bar, London. She came from a family of printers and her grandfather, Bernard Lintot (1675–1736), had the dubious distinction of being twice satirized by Alexander Pope. The Lintot firm held the patent as the king's legal printer and published texts by jurists Edward Coke, Anthony Fitzherbert, Giles Jacob, and Matthew Hale and others. They also published literary works by authors such as Susanna Centlivre, Mary Chudleigh, Sarah Piers, Mary Pix, and Elizabeth Singer Rowe.

Catherine Lintot inherited the Lintot printing house, then located "In the Savoy", after her father's death, but decided not to stay involved with its ongoing management. She sold a large part of the firm's literary property and, in 1760, she sold half her patent as king's law printer to Samuel Richardson, who amalgamated her printing house with his own in Fleet Street. When Richardson died in 1761, Lintot continued the business for a year in partnership with his widow, Elizabeth, after which the two sold the patent to Henry Woodfall and William Strahan.

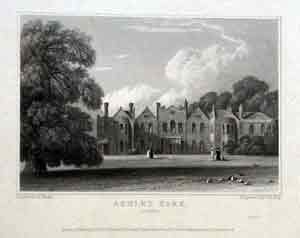
Ashley House, Ashley Park by John Preston Neale. Views of the Seats of Noblemen and Gentlemen in England, Wales, Scotland and Ireland. L.P, Vol. 4, 1818, p. 146.

On 20 October 1768 Lintot married Captain Henry Fletcher (1727–1807) of Ashley Park, Walton-on-Thames and long-time director at the East India Company. At the time of her marriage she had a fortune of £45,000, a considerable sum. The couple had two children, Catherine and Henry. In 1782, Henry Fletcher Sr. received a baronetcy. The elder Catherine Fletcher died on 17 October 1816 at their home in Ashley Park. A monument was raised to Catherine and Henry Fletcher in the church of Walton-on-Thames.

== See also ==
- List of women printers and publishers before 1800

== Notes and references ==
=== References ===
- Aitkin, G. A. "Lintot, Barnaby Bernard (1675–1736)". Oxford Dictionary of National Biography. Oxford University Press, 1892. Accessed 2023-07-21.
- British Book Trade Index. University of Oxford.
- George Edward Cokayne, ed. The Complete Baronetage. 5 Vols., c. 1900); reprint, Gloucester, U.K.: Alan Sutton Publishing, 1983.
- McLaverty, James. "Lintot [Lintott], (Barnaby) Bernard (1675–1736), bookseller". Oxford Dictionary of National Biography. September 23, 2004. Oxford University Press. Accessed 2023-07-21.
- Parker, J. G. "Fletcher, Sir Henry, first baronet (1727?–1807)". Oxford Dictionary of National Biography. September 23, 2004. Oxford University Press. Accessed 2023-07-21.
- The Women's Print History Project
