= The Verdict of You All =

1926 novel

- First edition (UK)
- Author: Henry Wade
- Language: English
- Genre: Detective
- Publisher: Constable (UK); Payson and Clarke (US)
- Publication date: 1926
- Publication place: United Kingdom
- Media type: Print

The Verdict of You All is a 1926 mystery detective novel by the British writer Henry Wade, his debut novel. Both this and his following novel The Missing Partners revolve around potential miscarriages of justice. It was published in the United States by Payson and Clarke in 1927. A success it launched his career as one of the prominent writers during the Golden Age of Detective Fiction. The title refers to the traditional question asked in court by a judge of the jury to establish whether they have reached a unanimous verdict.

== Synopsis ==
Inspector Dobson and his superior Superintendent Fraser are called in to investigate when a wealthy financier is found dead in the study of his London home.

== Bibliography ==
- Herbert, Rosemary. Whodunit?: A Who's Who in Crime & Mystery Writing. Oxford University Press, 2003.
- Magill, Frank Northen . Critical Survey of Mystery and Detective Fiction: Authors, Volume 4. Salem Press, 1988.
- Keating, Henry Reymond Fitzwalter. Whodunit?: A Guide to Crime, Suspense, and Spy Fiction. Van Nostrand Reinhold Company, 1982.
- Reilly, John M. Twentieth Century Crime & Mystery Writers. Springer, 2015.
- Edwards, Martin. The Golden Age of Murder. Harper Collins, 2015 (p. 196)
