= William Badcock (goldsmith) =

British artist

William Badcock (1622–1698) was a London goldsmith and hilt-maker and also the author of a book on the gold and silver trade.

He was admitted to the Worshipful Company of Goldsmiths of London in September 1668, and was also a member of the Longbow String Makers' Company of London.

He was the author of an influential book, "A Touch-stone for Gold and Silver Wares", published in 1677, which was enlarged in 1679 as "A New Touch-stone for Gold and Silver Wares". In the second edition, Badcock drew attention to the many fraudulent practices current in the trade at this period.

An example of his work - a sword with a hilt of cast and engraved silver and an etched blade (hallmark 1676–1677) can be found in Room 54b of the Victoria and Albert Museum.

Badcock's eldest son, Richard Badcock, married Jane, the daughter of Sir Salathiel Lovell and was an ancestor of the general, Lovell Benjamin Badcock and the admiral William Stanhope Badcock.

== External References ==
https://collections.vam.ac.uk/item/O78454/sword-badcock-william/
