= Floyd baronets =

Baronetcy in the Baronetage of the United Kingdom

The Floyd Baronetcy is a title in the Baronetage of the United Kingdom. It was created on 30 March 1816 for General John Floyd. He was second-in-command at the Battle of Seringapatam in 1799. Floyd's daughter Julia was the wife of Prime Minister Sir Robert Peel, 2nd Baronet. The fifth Baronet was a Brigadier in the 15th/19th Hussars and was Chief-of-Staff of the Eighth Army from 1944 to 1945. Between 1961 and 1968 he served as Lord-Lieutenant of Buckinghamshire. The seventh Baronet was High Sheriff of Rutland in 1968. The fourth baronet's youngest son, Charles Murray Floyd, was a prominent businessman, surveyor and land agent.

== Floyd baronets (1816) ==
- Sir John Floyd, 1st Baronet (1748–1818)
- Sir Henry Floyd, 2nd Baronet (1793–1868)
- Sir John Floyd, 3rd Baronet (1823–1909)
- Sir Henry Robert Peel Floyd, 4th Baronet (1855–1915)
- Brigadier Sir Henry Robert Kincaid Floyd, 5th Baronet (1899–1968)
- Sir John Duckett Floyd, 6th Baronet (1903–1975)
- Sir Giles Henry Charles Floyd, 7th Baronet (born 1932), married Lady Gillian Cecil, daughter of David Cecil, 6th Marquess of Exeter.

The heir apparent to the baronetcy is David Henry Cecil Floyd (born 1956), elder son of the 7th Baronet. His heir presumptive is his nephew Henry William Floyd (born 1994).

== Arms ==
Coat of arms of Floyd baronets
Crest A lion rampant reguardant Argent murally crowned Gules bearing a flag representing the standard of Tippoo Sultan flowing to the sinister Proper. Escutcheon Sable a lion rampant reguardant Argent on a chief embattled Or a sword erect Proper pommel and hilt Gold enfiled with an Eastern crown Gules between two tigers' faces also Proper. Motto Patiens Pulveris Atque Solis

== Notes ==
Baronetage of the United Kingdom
Preceded by Ogle baronets	Floyd baronets 30 March 1816	Succeeded by Elphinstone baronets
