= Salathiel Lovell =

English judge (1631/2–1713)

Sir Salathiel Lovell (1631/2–1713) was an English judge, Recorder of London, an ancient and bencher of Gray's Inn, and a Baron of the Exchequer.

== Origins and education ==
Lovell was the son of Benjamin Lovell, rector of Lapworth, Warwickshire, and brother of Robert Lovell, and was born in 1631 or 1632. Aside from his religious calling, his father was a parliamentarian in the English Civil War, serving for a time under Colonel William Purefoy, one of the regicides of King Charles I of England.

Salathiel Lovell was accepted into Gray's Inn to read for the Bar in 1648. He worked as a clerk in Buckinghamshire, and as one of the parish trustees of parish lands in Lapworth, before being called to the bar in November 1656.

== Career ==
He had moved to Northampton by 1661, as evidenced by baptism records for a son, also called Salathiel; was active in the factional politics of the town, and was relied upon as a legal authority, becoming the deputy Recorder of the town. He was active, too, within Gray's Inn, being appointed an ancient of the inn (a junior official role) in 1671 and six years later a bencher, or member of the controlling committee of the Inn.

Lovell clearly accommodated himself to the changing post-restoration times, but was suspected of radical whig politics by reason of his alleged involvement, in 1684, in the promulgation of an attack on acquiescence to the concept of the divine rights of kings. In the same year he was counsel for William Sacheverell, a prominent whig, who with others was indicted for a riot at an election for the mayoralty of Nottingham.

In June 1688 he became a serjeant-at-law, and four years later he was a candidate against James Selby for the recordership of London. Each candidate obtained twelve votes, and Lovell was elected by the casting vote of the Lord Mayor.

On 22 October 1692 he carried up an address of congratulation to William III of England at Kensington Palace on his return from abroad, and an invitation to a banquet at the Guildhall on Lord Mayor's Day, and was thereupon knighted. In 1695, on 24 May, the first day of term, he was called within the bar as king's serjeant, and in the following year became a judge on the Welsh circuit. He continued to be principally occupied with the administration of the criminal law, and in 1700 he petitioned the crown for a grant of the forfeited estate of Joseph Horton of Cotton Abbotts in Cheshire, on the ground that he had been more diligent in the discovery and conviction of criminals than any other person in the kingdom, and that he had been a loser by it, his post only being worth £80 annually (£14,200 in 2025), with few perquisites, and usually being regarded as a mere stepping-stone to a judgeship in Westminster Hall.

In June 1700, when the retirement of Baron Lechmere as a Baron of the Exchequer was expected, Lovell was looked on as his successor, but he continued without reward until he was appointed a fifth baron of the exchequer on 17 June 1708, at the age of 76. He had resigned his Welsh judgeship in the previous year, and now vacated the recordership.

== Judicial reputation ==
Lovell had a reputation for being both corrupt and sadistic. The writer and pamphleteer Daniel Defoe wrote of him:

"He trades in Justice and the Souls of Men,
And prostitutes them equally to Gain."

Unfortunately for Defoe, Lovell later presided over a trial in which Defoe was found guilty of seditious libel. He sentenced Defoe to pay an impossibly punitive fine, be publicly humiliated for days in a pillory and to serve an indeterminate term of imprisonment, decreeing that Defoe be set free only once he had paid the fine. Defoe's financial circumstances were such that he was unable to pay the fine. Lovell had deliberately structured the punishment to maximise the possibility that Defoe would remain incarcerated for the rest of his life.

Lovell also had a reputation for being incompetent. He was 'distinguished principally for his want of memory, and his title of recorder was converted into the nickname of the Obliviscor (forgetter) of London'.

Lovell's great-grandson, Richard Lovell Edgeworth, referring to the extent to which Lovell, by the end of his life, had lost his memory, related an anecdote told by his father of a lawyer pleading before Lovell being so rude as to say "Sir, you have forgotten the law", to which Lovell is reputed to have answered "Young man, I have forgotten more law, than you will ever remember".

== List of prominent people sentenced by Lovell ==
- Daniel Defoe, English writer, merchant, and spy. After Defoe was convicted of seditious libel, Lovell sentenced him to a fine, public humiliation for days in a pillory, and an indeterminate term of imprisonment. Defoe would later be released from prison after acquiring the patronage of Robert Harley, 1st Earl of Oxford and Earl Mortimer.
- John Law, Scottish-French economist and financier. After Law was convicted of murdering Edward 'Beau' Wilson in a duel over the affections of Elizabeth Hamilton, Countess of Orkney, Lovell sentenced him to death. The sentence was never carried out, and Law went on to found France's first central bank, John Law's Bank.
- William Chaloner, serial counterfeit coiner and confidence trickster. Chaloner's case was successfully prosecuted by Master of the Mint Sir Isaac Newton, and he was sentenced to death. Chaloner was hanged on March 22, 1699.

== Family and posterity ==
Lovell was married some time before 1661 to Mary; the couple had some ten sons and four daughters. He died 3 May 1713. His tomb is in Harlestone. His memorial is by Edward Stanton.

A son, Samuel, became a Welsh judge; but only one of the sons outlived Salathiel.

Richard Lovell Edgeworth, in his memoirs, provided an impression of Samuel Lovell:

"My grandfather, the Welsh (sic) judge, travelling over the sands near Beaumaris, as he was going circuit, was overtaken by the night and by the tide: his coach was set fast in quicksand; the water soon rose into the coach, and his register, and some other attendants, crept out of the windows and mounted on the roof, and on the coach-box. The judge let the water rise to his very lips, and with becoming gravity replied, to all the earnest entreaties of his attendants, 'I will follow your counsel, if you can quote any precedent for a judge's mounting a coach-box'"

Several of Lovell's descendants were notable figures in their own right, including:

- High Sheriff of Buckinghamshire Lovell Badcock
- High Sheriff of Buckinghamshire Thomas Stanhope Badcock
- Lieutenant-general Lovell Benjamin Badcock
- Vice-admiral William Stanhope Badcock
- Member of Parliament Lovell Stanhope
- Inventor and Lunar Society member Richard Lovell Edgeworth
- Novelist Maria Edgeworth
- Political economist Francis Ysidro Edgeworth

== See also ==
- Hanging judge
