= Sir Henry Floyd, 5th Baronet =

British Army officer (1899–1968)

Brigadier Sir Henry Floyd Bt CB CBE KStJ DL
- Born: 7 May 1899
- Died: 5 November 1968 (aged 69)
- Relatives: Lord Lieutenant of Buckinghamshire (1961–1968)
- Military career
- Allegiance: United Kingdom
- Branch: British Army
- Service years: 1918–1945
- Rank: Brigadier
- Service number: 17028
- Conflicts: First World War; Second World War
- Awards: Companion of the Order of the Bath; Commander of the Order of the British Empire; Legion of Merit (United States)

Brigadier Sir Henry Robert Kincaid Floyd, 5th Baronet (7 May 1899 – 5 November 1968) was a British Army officer.

== Personal life ==
Floyd was the son of Captain Sir Henry Robert Peel Floyd, 4th Baronet (a captain in the Royal Navy) and Edith Anne Kincaid-Smith. Floyd was the brother of Charles Murray Floyd.

Floyd married Kathleen Fanny Gretton (daughter of John Gretton) on 9 April 1922, with whom he had two daughters, Bridget Mary (1930—1977) Julia Maud (1934—1974). Bridget's father-in-law was Sir Henry Aubrey-Fletcher, 6th Baronet. Floyd, a fervent supporter of horseriding and fox hunting, he was killed in a riding accident at the age of 69.

== Military career ==
Floyd was educated at Eton College and at the Royal Military College, Sandhurst. He was an officer in the 15th/19th Hussars and, having been promoted to brigadier, during the Second World War he served as Brigadier General Staff (BGS) to VIII Corps, commanded by Lieutenant General Sir Richard O'Connor. He served with VIII Corps throughout Operation Overlord and was described as "a tower of strength to the new commander [O'Connor] and became a good friend as well". From October 1944 he was chief of staff of the Eighth Army, commanded by Lieutenant General Sir Richard McCreery, from 1944 to 1945. He was appointed a Companion of the Order of the Bath in July 1945.

Floyd served as Lord Lieutenant of Buckinghamshire from 1961 to 1968.

== Legacy ==
The Sir Henry Floyd Grammar School in Aylesbury is named after him, as is part of the postgraduate medical centre at Stoke Mandeville Hospital.

Coat of arms of Sir Henry Floyd, 5th Baronet
| Crest A lion rampant reguardant Argent murally crowned Gules bearing a flag representing the standard of Tippoo Sultan flowing to the sinister Proper. Escutcheon Sable a lion rampant reguardant Argent on a chief embattled Or a sword erect Proper pommel and hilt Gold enfiled with an Eastern crown Gules between two tigers' faces also Proper. Motto Patiens Pulveris Atque Solis |

== Bibliography ==
- Baynes, John (1989). The Forgotten Victor: General Sir Richard O'Connor, KT, GCB, DSO, MC (1st ed.). Potomac Books. ISBN 0-08-036269-9.

Honorary titles
| Preceded by Sir Philip Chetwode, Bt | Colonel of the 15th/19th King's Royal Hussars; 1947–1957 | Succeeded by Sir William Hinde |
| Preceded by Sir Henry Aubrey-Fletcher, Bt | Lord Lieutenant of Buckinghamshire; 1961–1968 | Succeeded by John Young |
Baronetage of the United Kingdom
| Preceded by Henry Floyd | Baronet (of Chearsley Hill, Bucks); 1915–1968 | Succeeded by John Floyd |
