= Thomas Stanhope Badcock =

Thomas Stanhope Badcock (1749–1821) was High Sheriff of Buckinghamshire in the year 1809 and was a descendant of Sir Salathiel Lovell.

In 1797, he inherited the estates of Little Missenden Abbey in Buckinghamshire and Maplethorpe Hall in Lincolnshire following the premature death of his brother, Lovell Badcock, who died unmarried.

He married Anne, daughter of William Buckle, of the Mythe House Tawkesbury, on 17 February 1780 and by this union had two sons and two daughters. His sons, Lovell Benjamin Badcock and William Stanhope Badcock went on to have distinguished military and naval careers, becoming a lieutenant-general and vice-admiral respectively, whilst his eldest daughter, Anne Badcock was married in 1809 to Major-General Sir Jasper Nicolls KCB. His youngest daughter, Sophia Badcock, was married in 1814 to the Reverend James Duke Coleridge, a nephew of the poet, Samuel Taylor Coleridge.

Badcock died on 13 April 1821 and is buried in the Abbey Church at Bath.
