= The Litmore Snatch =

1957 novel

- First edition (UK)
- Author: Henry Wade
- Language: English
- Genre: Detective
- Publisher: Constable (UK); Macmillan Inc. (US)
- Publication date: 1957
- Publication place: United Kingdom
- Media type: Print

The Litmore Snatch is a 1957 detective thriller novel by the British writer Henry Wade. It was his final novel. Like much of Wade's work it takes the form of a standard police procedural. A review in The Guardian by fellow crime writer Anthony Berkeley considered the "book is a quiet and almost factual account of the police procedure following the kidnapping of a small boy for ransom, and personally I found it fascinating"

== Synopsis ==
The owner of a newspaper in a seaside town in the North East of England receives threatening letters. Soon afterwards his ten-year-old son is kidnapped and a £10,000 ransom demanded.

== Bibliography ==
- Cooper, John & Pike, B.A. Artists in Crime: An Illustrated Survey of Crime Fiction First Edition Dustwrappers, 1920-1970. Scolar Press, 1995.
- Reilly, John M. Twentieth Century Crime & Mystery Writers. Springer, 2015.
