= Badcock Home Furniture &more =

American retail chain

W.S. Badcock LLC
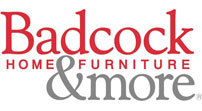

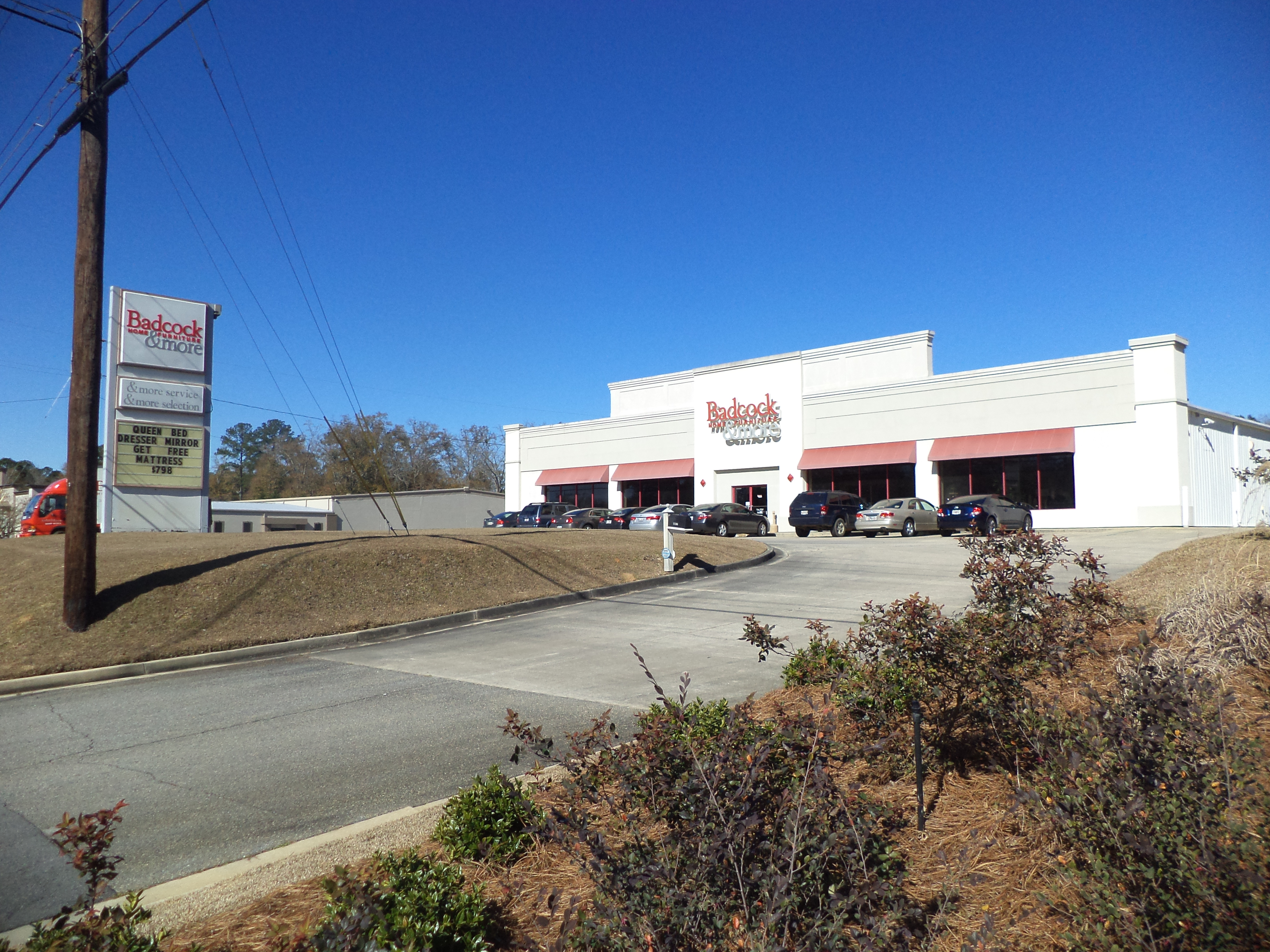
- Location in Valdosta, Georgia
- Formerly: Badcock Home Furniture & More
- Type: Subsidiary
- Industry: Retail (furniture)
- Founded: 1904; 122 years ago
- Founder: Wogan S. Badcock
- Defunct: October 31, 2024; 22 months ago (except South Florida locations)
- Fate: Bankruptcy And Liquidation
- Headquarters: Mulberry, Florida
- Number of locations: 370+ (2023); 10 (2026; South Florida locations only)
- Key people: Mitchell Stiles, president
- Products: Furniture, bedding, appliances, electronics, accessories and floor coverings
- Revenue: ▲US$253.2 million (2023)
- Number of employees: 1,200 (2023)
- Parent: Conn's (2023–2024)
- Website: www.badcock.com

W.S. Badcock LLC (stylized as Badcock Home Furniture & More) was an American chain of over 370 company and dealer-owned furniture stores in eight states across the southeastern United States. Robert B. Burnette was president of Badcock Home Furniture and previously served as chief operating officer for this company.

As of 2026, Badcock & More still exists in South Florida, with 10 stores remaining as part of a license agreement.

== History ==
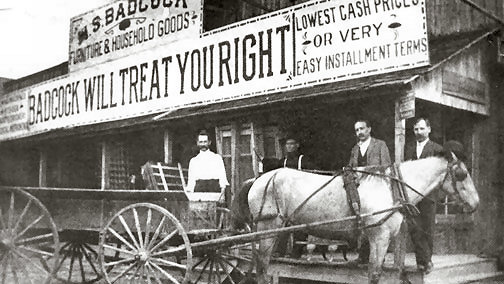
The first Badcock store in Mulberry, Florida, 1904.

The first store was opened by Henry S. Badcock in Mulberry, Florida, in 1904. A year before being listed by Furniture Today magazine in the top 25 furniture retailers by sales, it was recognized as a centennial retailer by Florida Governor Jeb Bush in 2004. In December 2023, it was announced that Conn's had completed its purchase of the company.

In July 2024, Conn's warned that it may file for Chapter 11 bankruptcy protection within the coming weeks, blaming inflation and a decline in sales for the decision. The company also blamed its purchase of Badcock for its losses and struggles. On July 23, 2024, Conn's announced that it would close up to 106 stores across both the Conn's and Badcock brands, with 71 Conn's stores and 35 Badcock stores set to close by the end of summer 2024.

That same day, Conn's filed for Chapter 11 bankruptcy protection in Texas, listing assets and liabilities of between $1 billion and $10 billion. The next day, on July 24, 2024, it was reported that Conn's was in the process of winding down and closing all of its nearly 600 Conn's and Badcock locations, with liquidation sales expected to be complete by October 31, 2024.

Conn's operated an additional 150 stores but had amassed $2 billion in debt, according to the bankruptcy filing. The publicly traded company finished 2023 with a net loss of $77 million, Conn's said in an April disclosure.

According to its bankruptcy filing, Conn's anticipated closing all locations of its Badcock and Conn's stores, which employed about 3,800 full-time employees and 150 part-time employees. Conn's operated locations in 15 states, totaling 553 retail stores and 22 distribution and service facilities, including its Badcock stores.

Badcock & More still exists in South Florida, as those stores are part of a franchising agreement.
