= Lovell Benjamin Badcock =

British general (1786–1861)

General Sir Lovell Benjamin Badcock Lovell, KCB, KH (born Badcock; 1786 – 11 March 1861) was a lieutenant-general in the British Army. He was a descendant of Sir Salathiel Lovell through the marriage of Lovell's daughter, Jane Lovell, to Richard Badcock, the eldest son of William Badcock, a London goldsmith.

== Biography ==
He was born Lovell Benjamin Badcock, the eldest son of Thomas Stanhope Badcock of Little Missenden Abbey, Buckinghamshire and Maplethorpe Hall, Lincolnshire.

Educated at Eton, Badcock commenced his distinguished military career in the Royal Bucks Militia. He fought under General Auchmuty at Montevideo in 1807 and went through the Peninsula War with the 14th Light Dragoons until 1813, being awarded the Peninsular Medal with eleven clasps, a greater number than was given to any other officer of cavalry.

On retirement, he became Colonel of the 12th Lancers. He died at Brighton on 11 March 1861, having never married. He and his younger brother, Admiral William Stanhope Badcock, changed their name of Badcock to Lovell by sign-manual in 1840.

There is no known familial relationship between Lovell Benjamin Badcock and another prominent nineteenth century British Army general bearing the same surname - General Sir Alexander Robert Badcock.

A portrait of Badcock by T.W. MacKay, in hussar uniform, hangs in Calke Abbey, Derbyshire.

Military offices
Preceded by Sir Henry John Cumming	Colonel of the 12th (The Prince of Wales's); Royal Regiment of (Light) Dragoons (Lancers); 1856–1861	Succeeded by George Henry Lockwood
