= Mist on the Saltings =

1933 novel

- First edition
- Author: Henry Wade
- Language: English
- Genre: Mystery Thriller
- Publisher: Constable
- Publication date: 1933
- Publication place: United Kingdom
- Media type: Print

Mist on the Saltings is a 1933 mystery thriller novel by the British writer Henry Wade. It marked a change in Wade's work, part of the Golden Age of Detective Fiction, with a shift toward more realistic character development and a favouring of accurate police procedural methods over the puzzle elements compared to his earlier novels. Celebrated crime novelist Dorothy L. Sayers wrote a review of the novel for the Sunday Times.

Unusually for detective fiction, the murder doesn't take place until the thirteenth chapter and much of the plot focuses on the conditions that led to the killing in a small village on the Norfolk coast.

== Bibliography ==
- Evans, Curtis. Masters of the "Humdrum" Mystery: Cecil John Charles Street, Freeman Wills Crofts, Alfred Walter Stewart and the British Detective Novel, 1920-1961. McFarland, 2014.
- Reilly, John M. Twentieth Century Crime & Mystery Writers. Springer, 2015.
