= Sir Henry Aubrey-Fletcher, 6th Baronet =

English cricketer and mystery writer (1887–1969)

Sir Henry Aubrey-Fletcher Bt KStJ CVO DSO
- 1962 portrait
- Born: Henry Lancelot Fletcher; 10 September 1887; Leigh, Surrey, England
- Died: 30 May 1969 (aged 81); Witney, Oxfordshire, England
- Occupations: Novelist; short story writer
- Spouses: Mary Augusta Chilton (m. 1911; died 1963) Nancy Cecil Bull (m. 1965)
- Writing career
- Pen name: Henry Wade
- Genres: Murder mystery; detective story; crime fiction; thriller
- Movement: Golden Age of Detective Fiction

Major Sir Henry Lancelot Aubrey-Fletcher, 6th Baronet KStJ CVO DSO (10 September 1887 – 30 May 1969), also known by his pen name Henry Wade, was Lord Lieutenant of Buckinghamshire from 1954 to 1961. He was also one of the leading authors during the Golden Age of Detective Fiction. He is known for his Inspector Poole novels, which started with The Duke of York's Steps (1929).

== Life ==
Aubrey-Fletcher was the only son and second child of Sir Lancelot Aubrey-Fletcher, 5th Baronet and Emily Harriet Wade (married 18 April 1882 St Anne, Soho, London). His father had already had another son by a previous marriage, but the child died in infancy. He was educated at Eton College and New College, Oxford.

He fought in both the First World War and Second World War with the Grenadier Guards, being awarded the Distinguished Service Order and French Croix de guerre in 1917. He was a member of Buckinghamshire County Council and appointed High Sheriff of Buckinghamshire in 1925.

He played Minor counties cricket between 1921 and 1928 for Buckinghamshire. He was also, under the pen name of Henry Wade, a noted mystery writer and one of the founding members of the Detection Club.

He married Mary Augusta Chilton in 1911 and with her had five children:

- John Henry Lancelot Aubrey-Fletcher (1912–1992)
- Nigel Chilton Aubrey-Fletcher (1914–1980)
- Lancelot Philip Aubrey-Fletcher (1919–2000)
- Mary Elizabeth Aubrey-Fletcher (1923–1994)
- Lieutenant-Colonel Edward Henry Lancelot Aubrey-Fletcher (born 6 May 1930), married to Henry Floyd's daughter Bridget (1930—1977) in 1953.

After the death of his wife in 1963, he married Nancy Cecil Bull in 1965. Sir Henry died on 30 May 1969, aged 81. His estate was valued at £108 537.

== Detective and mystery books ==
List of works published by "Henry Wade".

=== Inspector Poole novels ===
- The Duke of York's Steps, 1929
- No Friendly Drop, 1931
- Constable Guard Thyself, 1934
- Bury Him Darkly, 1936
- Lonely Magdalen, 1940
- Too Soon to Die, 1953
- Gold Was Our Grave, 1954

=== Other novels ===
- The Verdict of You All, 1926
- The Missing Partners 1928
- The Dying Alderman, 1930
- The Hanging Captain, 1932
- Mist on the Saltings, 1933
- Heir Presumptive, 1935
- The High Sheriff, 1937
- Released for Death, 1938
- Harvey in Scotland, 1938
- New Graves at Great Norne, 1947
- Diplomat’s Folly, 1951
- Be Kind to the Killer, 1952
- A Dying Fall, 1955
- The Litmore Snatch, 1957

=== Short stories ===
Policeman's Lot, 1933

- "Duello" (Inspector Poole story)
- "The Missing Undergraduate" (Inspector Poole story)
- "Wind in the East" (Inspector Poole story)
- "The Sub-Branch" (Inspector Poole story)
- "The Real Thing" (Inspector Poole story)
- "The Baronet's Finger" (Inspector Poole story)
- "The Three Keys" (Inspector Poole story)
- "A Matter of Luck"
- "Four to One - Bar One"
- "Payment in Full"
- "Jealous Gun"
- "The Amateurs"
- "The Tenth Round"

Here Comes the Copper, 1938

- "These Artists!"
- "The Seagull"
- "The Ham Sandwich"
- "Summer Meeting"
- "Anti-Tank"
- "A Puff of Smoke"
- "Steam Coal"
- "Toll of the Road"
- "November Night"
- "The Little Sportsman"
- "Lodgers"
- "One Good Turn"
- "Smash and Grab"

Other stories

- "Cotton Wool and Cutlets" (20 Story Magazine May 1940 - Sergeant Bragg story)

== Arms ==
Coat of arms of Sir Henry Aubrey-Fletcher, 6th Baronet
Crest: 1. A horse's head argent charged with a trefoil gules (Fletcher); 2. An eagle's head erased or (Aubrey).; Escutcheon Quarterly: 1st and 4th, sable, a cross engrailed argent, between four plates, each charged with an arrow of the first (Fletcher), 2nd and 3rd, azure, a chevron between three eagle’s heads erased or (Aubrey) Motto Martis non Cupidinis (Belonging to Mars, not Cupid) Orders Royal Victorian Order - Commander (CVO); Distinguished Service Order (DSO)

Honorary titles
Preceded by The Lord Cottesloe	Lord Lieutenant of Buckinghamshire; 1954–1961	Succeeded by Sir Henry Floyd, Bt
Baronetage of Great Britain
Preceded by Lancelot Aubrey-Fletcher	Baronet (of Clea); 1937–1969	Succeeded by John Aubrey-Fletcher
