= Lord Lieutenant of Buckinghamshire =

Civil post in Buckinghamshire, England

There has been a Lord Lieutenant of Buckinghamshire almost continuously since the position was created by King Henry VIII in 1535. The only exception to this was the English Civil War and English Interregnum between 1643 and 1660 when there was no king to support the Lieutenancy. The following list consists of all known holders of the position: earlier records (prior to 1607) have been lost and so a complete list is not possible. Since 1702, all Lord Lieutenants have also been Custos Rotulorum of Buckinghamshire.

- Charles Brandon, 1st Duke of Suffolk 1545 (died 22 August 1545)
- Unknown period 1545 – 1551
- Edward Seymour, 1st Duke of Somerset 10 May 1551 – beheaded 22 January 1552
- Francis Russell, 2nd Earl of Bedford 1552
- William Parr, 1st Marquess of Northampton 1553 (attainted 1553)
- Unknown period 1553 – 1559
- Thomas Howard, 4th Duke of Norfolk 1559
- Unknown period 1559 – 1569
- Arthur Grey, 14th Baron Grey de Wilton 1569
- Unknown period 1569 – 1586
- Arthur Grey, 14th Baron Grey de Wilton 12 September 1586 – 14 October 1593
- Unknown period 1593 – 1607
- Thomas Egerton, 1st Baron Ellesmere 22 December 1607 – 15 September 1616
- George Villiers, 1st Duke of Buckingham 16 September 1616 – assassinated 23 August 1628
- Philip Herbert, 4th Earl of Pembroke 28 September 1628 – 1641
- Robert Dormer, 1st Earl of Carnarvon 2 June 1641 – 1643 (Royalist Lieutenant)
- William Paget, 5th Baron Paget 1641 – May 1642 (Parliamentarian Lieutenant)
- Philip Wharton, 4th Baron Wharton 1642 (Parliamentarian Lieutenant)
- No Lord Lieutenant in place during English Civil War and English Interregnum
- John Egerton, 2nd Earl of Bridgewater 23 July 1660 – 26 October 1686
- John Egerton, 3rd Earl of Bridgewater 26 November 1686 – 1687
- George Jeffreys, 1st Baron Jeffreys 12 November 1687 – 1689
- John Egerton, 3rd Earl of Bridgewater 4 April 1689 – 19 March 1701
- Thomas Wharton, 5th Baron Wharton 23 January 1702 – 1702
- William Cheyne, 2nd Viscount Newhaven 18 June 1702 – 1702
- Scroop Egerton, 4th Earl of Bridgewater 14 January 1703 – 1711
- Henry Grey, 1st Duke of Kent 1711 – 1712
- William Cheyne, 2nd Viscount Newhaven 22 May 1712 – 1714
- Scroop Egerton, 1st Duke of Bridgewater 8 December 1714 – 1728
- Richard Temple, 1st Viscount Cobham 23 February 1728 – 1738
- Charles Spencer, 3rd Duke of Marlborough 26 January 1739 – 20 October 1758
- Richard Grenville-Temple, 2nd Earl Temple 15 January 1759 – 1763
- Francis Dashwood, 11th Baron le Despencer 16 May 1763 – 11 December 1781
- Philip Stanhope, 5th Earl of Chesterfield 5 January 1782 – 1782
- George Nugent-Temple-Grenville, 1st Marquess of Buckingham 8 April 1782 – 11 February 1813
- Richard Temple-Nugent-Brydges-Chandos-Grenville, 1st Duke of Buckingham and Chandos 9 March 1813 – 17 January 1839
- Robert Carrington, 2nd Baron Carrington 1 February 1839 – 17 March 1868
- Richard Temple-Nugent-Brydges-Chandos-Grenville, 3rd Duke of Buckingham and Chandos 23 July 1868 – 26 March 1889
- Nathan Mayer Rothschild, 1st Baron Rothschild 20 May 1889 – 31 March 1915
- Charles Wynn-Carington, 1st Marquess of Lincolnshire 10 May 1915 – 1923
- Thomas Fremantle, 3rd Baron Cottesloe 10 July 1923 – 29 June 1954 (Note: "No. 32845". The London Gazette. 17 July 1923. p. 4920. (appointment); "No. 40219". The London Gazette. 29 June 1954. p. 3829. (resignation).)
- Sir Henry Aubrey-Fletcher, 6th Baronet 29 June 1954 – 1961
- Sir Henry Floyd, 5th Baronet 27 July 1961 – 5 November 1968
- John Darling Young 9 May 1969 – 1984
- John Fremantle, 5th Baron Cottesloe 1984–1997
- Sir Nigel Mobbs 1997 – 21 October 2005
- Sir Henry Aubrey-Fletcher, 8th Baronet 2006–27 November 2020
- Elizabeth Curzon, Countess Howe 27 November 2020–present

== Deputy lieutenants ==
A deputy lieutenant of Buckinghamshire is commissioned by the Lord Lieutenant of Buckinghamshire. Deputy lieutenants support the work of the lord-lieutenant. There can be several deputy lieutenants at any time, depending on the population of the county. Their appointment does not terminate with the changing of the lord-lieutenant, but they usually retire at age 75.

=== 19th Century ===
- 31 October 1846: William Jenney
- 31 October 1846: John Kay
- 31 October 1846: Henry Worley
- 31 October 1846: William Clayton

=== 20th Century ===
- 5 January 1900: Sir Robert Grenville Harvey, 2nd Baronet

== See also ==
- High Sheriff of Buckinghamshire
