= High Sheriff of Buckinghamshire =

British government office

The High Sheriff of Buckinghamshire, in common with other counties, was originally the King's representative on taxation upholding the law in Saxon times. The word Sheriff evolved from 'shire-reeve'.

Sheriff is the oldest secular office under the Crown. Formerly the sheriff was the principal law enforcement officer in the county but over the centuries most of the responsibilities associated with the post have been transferred elsewhere or are now defunct, so that its functions are now largely ceremonial. Under the provisions of the Local Government Act 1972, on 1 April 1974 the office previously known as Sheriff was retitled High Sheriff.

The title of sheriff is therefore much older than the other Crown appointment, the Lord Lieutenant of Buckinghamshire, which came about in 1535.

Unlike the Lord Lieutenant of Buckinghamshire, which is generally held from appointment until the holder's death or incapacity, the title of High Sheriff is appointed or reappointed annually. The High Sheriff is assisted by an Under-Sheriff of Buckinghamshire.

As with the Lord Lieutenant, the purview of the High Sheriff includes both unitary authorities: Buckinghamshire Council(for the south and centre of the county) and Milton Keynes City Council (for the north of the county).

== List of sheriffs ==
=== Before 1125 ===
- Before 1066: Godric, (killed in 1066)
- 1066–c. 1084: Ansculf de Picquigny
- c. 1087-1094: Hugh de Beauchamp
- c.1100: Geoffrey
- 1124: Richard of Winchester

=== 1125 to 1575 ===
- For 1125 to 1575, see Sheriff of Bedfordshire and Buckinghamshire.

=== 1575–1599 ===
- 15 November 1575: John Croke, of Chilton
- 13 November 1576: Griffith Hampden, of Great Hampden
- 27 November 1577: Michael Blount
- 17 November 1578: Robert Drury, of Hedgerley
- 23 November 1579: Richard Crawford
- 21 November 1580: Paul Darrell, of Lillingstone Dayrell
- 27 November 1581: Thomas Tasburgh, of Hawridge
- 5 December 1582: Edmund Verney, of Middle Claydon
- 25 November 1583: William Hawtrey, of Chequers in Ellisborough
- 19 November 1584: Robert Dormer, of Wing Park
- 22 November 1585: Edward Bulstrode, of Hedgerley Bulstrode
- 14 November 1586: John Temple, of Stowe
- 4 December 1587: Sir John Goodwyn, of Upper Winchendon
- 25 November 1588: John Borlase, of Bockmere (2nd term)
- 24 November 1589: Francis Cheyne, of Chesham Bois
- 24 November 1590: George Fleetwood, of the Vache
- 25 November 1591: Alexander Hampden, of Hartwell
- 16 November 1592: Henry Longueville, of Wolverton
- 26 November 1593: Thomas Pigott, of Doddershall
- 21 November 1594: Michael Harcourt, of Leckhampstead
- 27 November 1595: Edward Tyrrell, of Thornton
- 22 November 1596: Anthony Tyringham, of Tyringham
- 25 November 1597: John Dormer, of Dorton
- 28 November 1598: William Garrard, of Dorney Court
- 2 December 1599: Sir William Clerke, of Shabbington

=== 1600–1699 ===
- 24 November 1600: Thomas Denton, of Hillesden
- 2 December 1601: William Borlase, of Bockmere
- 7 December 1602: Anthony Chester, of Chicheley Hall
- 1 December 1603: Sir Francis Cheyne, of Chesham Bois
- 5 November 1604: Sir William Willoughby, of Marlow
- 2 February 1606: Sir Richard Ingoldsby, of Lenborough
- 17 November 1606: Sir Henry Longueville, of Wolverton
- 9 November 1607: Sir William Andrews, of Lathbury
- 12 November 1608: Sir Francis Fortescue, of Salden
- 1609: Anthony Greenway, of Leckhampstead
- 6 November 1610: Sir Robert Lovet, of Liscombe
- 1611: Sir Jerome Horsey, of Great Kimbell
- 1612: Sir Edward Tyrell, of Thornton
- 1613: Simon Mayne, of Dinton
- 1614: Brian Janson, of Beaconsfield
- 6 November 1615: Sir Edmund Wheler, of Riding Court in Datchet
- 11 November 1616: Sir Thomas Temple, 1st Baronet, of Stowe
- 6 November 1617: Sir William Fortescue
- 29 November 1617: Sir John Laurence, of Iver
- 9 November 1618: Francis Duncombe, of Broughton
- 1619: Benedict Winchcombe, of Ashendon
- 6 November 1620: Sir Henry Lee, 1st Baronet, of Quarendon
- 1621: Sir John Dynham, of Boarstall
- 7 November 1622: Sir William Fleetwood, of Missenden Abbey
- 1623: Sir Francis Goodwyn, of Upper Winchendon (Note: Erroneously called "Thomas" by Willis.)
- 1624: Edward Penn, of Penn
- 1625: Sir Edward Coke, of Stoke Poges
- 1626: Sir Gilbert Gerard, 1st Baronet, of Aston Clinton
- 4 November 1627: Thomas Darrell, of Lillingstone Dayrell
- 1627: Robert Smith or Francis Catesby, of Hardmead
- 1628: Thomas Lee, of Hartwell
- 1629: Sir William Andrews, of Lathbury
- 7 November 1630: Sir Thomas Hyde, 2nd Baronet, of Horton
- 1631: Henry Bulstrode or Sir William Smyth, of Radcliffe
- 1632: James Duppa
- 1632: Robert Dormer, of Lee Grange
- 10 November 1633: Sir Francis Cheyne, of Chesham Bois
- 5 November 1634: Sir Peter Temple, of Stowe
- 1635: Heneage Proby, of Raynes in Amersham
- 3 October 1636: Sir Anthony Chester, 2nd Baronet, of Chicheley Hall
- 30 September 1637: Sir Alexander Denton, of Hillesden
- 4 November 1638: Sir John Parsons
- 1639: Thomas Archdale, of High Wycombe
- 1640: Sir Thomas Piggott
- 1641: Richard Greenville, of Wotton Underwood
- 1642: Sir John Tyringham, of Tyringham
- 30 December 1643: Thomas Bulstrode
- 17 January 1644: Sir Heneage Proby
- 29 August 1644: Henry Beke, of Hadenham
- 1 December 1646: William Bowyer of Denham Court
- 17 November 1647: Richard Berringer, of Iver
- 23 November 1648: John Clarke, of Hitcham
- 1648: Sir Thomas Sanders
- 7 November 1649: Richard Atkins, of Newport Pagnell
- 7 November 1650: Simon Bennet, of Beachampton and Calverton
- 4 November 1651: Robert Dormer, of Dortonor Lee Grange
- 12 November 1652: John Laurence, of Bradwell Abbey
- 10 November 1653: Thomas Hampson, of Taplow
- 1654: Roger Price, of Westbury, Buckinghamshire
- 1655: George Tash, of Iver
- 1656: William Penn, of Penn
- 1657: Thomas Coppin, jun., of Emberton
- 1658: Henry Chester, of Chicheley Hall
- 1659: Thomas Catesby
- 5 November 1660: William Abell, of East Claydon
- 1661: Sir Francis Cheney, of Chesham Bois
- 1661: John Corrance, of Haversham
- 1662: Sir Robert Gayer, of Stoke Poges
- 1663: Robert Lovet, of Liscombe
- 1664: Francis or Thomas Duncombe, of Broughton
- 12 November 1665: Simon Bennet, of Beachampton and Calverton
- 7 November 1666: Thomas Risley, of Chetwode
- 6 November 1667: Nicholas le Grice, of Iver
- 6 November 1668: Sir Anthony Chester, 3rd Baronet, of Chicheley Hall
- 11 November 1669: Maurice Thompson
- Michaelmas 1669: John Thompson, of Haversham
- 3 November 1670: Joseph Alston, of Bradwell Abbey
- 9 November 1671: Richard Greenville, of Wotton Underwood
- 11 November 1672: Sir Roger Hill, of Denham
- 12 November 1673: Henry Sumner
- 13 November 1673: Thomas Lewis, of Boarstall
- 23 December 1673: Henry Sumner
- 5 November 1674: Sir Henry Palmer, 3rd Baronet
- 11 November 1674: Thomas Lewis, of Boarstall
- 15 November 1675: Sir Henry Palmer, 3rd Baronet
- 1675: Thomas Bard
- 9 November 1676: Sir Compton Reade
- 18 November 1676: Thomas Berringer
- 15 November 1677: Sir Compton Reade, 1st Baronet
- 14 November 1678: Thomas Edgerley, of Water Stratford
- 13 November 1679: Francis Knollys, of Lower Winchendon
- 4 November 1680: Sir Dennis Hampson, 3rd Baronet, of Taplow
- 1680: Roger Price, of Westbury, near Buckingham
- 10 November 1681: Thomas Hacket, of North Crawley
- 13 November 1682: John Cullen, of Wavendon
- 12 November 1683: Sir Dennis Hampson, 3rd Baronet, of Taplow
- 20 November 1684: Robert Hart, of Brill
- 30 November 1685: Edward Leigh, of Iver
- 25 November 1686: Nicholas Salter, of Ankerwycke
- 5 December 1687: Sir Edward Longueville, 3rd Baronet
- 8 November 1688: William Fleetwode, of Great Missenden or Missenden Abbey
- 18 November 1689: Edmund Waller, of Gregory's in Beaconsfield
- 27 November 1690: Sir Thomas Tyrrell, 3rd Baronet, of Haversham
- 29 November 1690: Henry Tyrrell, of Haversham
- 14 December 1691: Henry Neale, of Dinton or Hulcote
- 17 November 1692: Edmund Duffield, of Medmenham
- 28 November 1692: Francis Duffield
- 16 November 1693: Johnshall Crosse, of Bledlow
- 6 December 1694: Hugh Horton, of Grove in Ellesborough
- 5 December 1695: John Leigh, of Iver
- 3 December 1696: Richard Akin, of Hambleden
- 1696: Adam Waring
- 16 December 1697: John Rogers, of Lenborough
- 22 December 1698: John Sparke, of Chipping Wycombe
- 20 November 1699: Richard Whitchurch, of Chalfont St Peter

=== 1700–1799 ===
- 28 November 1700: Robert Weedon, of Fawley
- 1 January 1702: Sir Henry Palmer, 3rd Baronet
- 19 January 1702: Richard Darrell, of Lillingstone Dayrell
- 2 February 1702: Henry Hawes, of Princes Risborough
- 9 February 1702: John Duncombe, of East Claydon
- 3 December 1702: Sir Joseph Alston, 3rd Baronet, of Bradwell Abbey
- 2 December 1703: Henry Gould, of Noke Mill in Iver
- 21 December 1704: Henry Andrews, of Lathbury
- 3 December 1705: Edward Harvey, of Chilton
- 14 November 1706: Roger Penn, of Penn
- 20 November 1707: Timothy Wingfield, of Agmondesham
- 29 November 1708: John Perryman, of Farnham Royal
- 1 December 1709: John Fleetwode, of Missenden Abbey
- 24 November 1710: Robert Grange, of Little Horwood
- 10 January 1712: Richard Seare, of Great Missenden
- 11 December 1712: Hatton Tash, snr., of Iver
- 30 November 1713: John Davenport, jnr., of Datchet
- 16 November 1714: John Hillersden, of Stoke Hammond
- 22 November 1715: John Throckmorton
- 5 December 1715: Francis Tyrringham
- 13 December 1715: John Leapidge, of Emberton
- 12 November 1716: William Mead, of Aylesbury
- 21 December 1717: John Throckmorton, of Warrington in Olney
- 21 December 1718: Edward Sparke, of Chipping Wycombe
- 3 December 1719: William Proby, of Agmondesham or Raynes in Amersham
- 3 January 1721: Thomas Ingoldsby of Waldridge in Dinton
- 14 December 1721: Daniel Baker, of Penn
- 11 December 1722: John Fuller, of Bradwell Abbey
- 4 January 1723 : Martin Basil, of Beaconsfield
- 12 January 1724: John Harding, of Cheshunt
- 22 January 1724: Richard Cheney, of Chilton Park
- 5 February 1725: Richard Smith, of Padbury
- 13 January 1726: Thomas Uthwate, of Great Lynford
- 29 November 1726: Richard Sydenham, of Hugenden
- 16 December 1727: John Sheppard, of Stucley
- 22 December 1727: Francis Tyringham, of Lower Winchendon
- 18 December 1728: John Lydgold, of Sidenham or Burnham
- 22 January 1730: George Franklyn, of Hadenham
- 14 December 1730: Bernard Tournay, of Cublington
- 9 December 1731: Benjamin Woodnoth, of Thornborough
- 11 January 1733: Thomas Whitchurch, of Chalfont St. Peter's
- 25 January 1733: Thomas Saunders, of Brill
- 20 December 1733: Benjamin Burroughs
- 19 December 1734: John Ware, of Chesham
- 18 December 1735: John Pollard, of Leckhampstead
- 19 January 1736: James Herbert, of Kingsey
- 12 January 1737: Richard Lowndes, of Winslow
- 21 December 1738: John Pigott, of Doddershall
- 27 December 1739: Thomas James Selby, of Wavendon
- 24 December 1740: William Perry
- 31 December 1741: Charles Savage, of Hitchendon
- 2 February 1742: Richard Eskrigge
- 16 December 1742: Edward Lascelles, of Datchett,
- 19 January 1743: Charles Price, of Aston Sandford
- 5 January 1744: Risley Risley, of Chetwood
- 10 January 1745: Giles Burroughs, of Long Crendon
- 16 January 1746: George Pearse, of Mendsmore
- 15 January 1747: Thomas Kensey, of Chilton
- 10 February 1748: Thomas Turney, of Surcott
- 11 January 1749: Thomas Leigh, of Iver
- 1 February 1749: Henry Purefoy, of Shalston
- 17 January 1750: Alexander Townsend, of Thornbury
- 6 December 1750: Sir Richard Atkins, 6th Baronet
- 16 January 1751: Henry Lovibond, of Oving
- 14 January 1752: John Bristow, of Ellesborough
- 7 February 1753: Charles Woodnoth, of Maid's Moreton
- 31 January 1754: John Wilkes, of Aylesbury
- 29 January 1755: Henry Uthwaite, of Lathbury
- 27 January 1756: Thomas Worster, of Cheddington
- 4 February 1757: Richard Lane, of Mill Lane
- 27 January 1758: John Ansell, of Great Missenden
- 2 February 1759: John Osborne, of Turvill
- 16 February 1760: Thomas Saunders, of Brill
- 27 January 1761: Sir John Vanhatten
- 15 February 1762: James Harding, of Amersham
- 4 February 1763: Joseph Buckett, of St. Leonard's
- 7 February 1764: William Lloyd, of Beaconsfield
- 1 February 1765: William Backwell, of Caldecot
- 17 February 1766: George Richard Carter, of Chilton
- 13 February 1767: Matthew Knapp, of Little Lynford
- 15 January 1768: William Cresswell Wentworth, of Leckhampstead
- 27 January 1769: John Lane, of Taplow
- 13 March 1769: George Wright, of Grayhurst
- 9 February 1770: Edmund Basil, of Beaconsfield
- 6 February 1771: Thomas Dorrell, of Hingest
- 17 February 1772: Sir William Lee, 4th Baronet, of Hartwell
- 8 February 1773: Richard Reading, of Hardwick
- 7 February 1774: Henry Thomas Gott, of Newland
- 6 February 1775: John Norris, of Hughenden Manor
- 5 February 1776: Robert Campbell, of Fullmere
- 31 January 1777: Benjamin Way, of Denham
- 28 January 1778: George Shergould, of Iver
- 1 February 1779: John Carter Pollard, of Finmere
- 2 February 1780: Isaac Eeles, of Amersham
- 5 February 1781: Joseph Bullock, of Caversfield
- 1 February 1782: Joseph Jacques, of Tickford Park
- 25 February 1782: Sir Jonathan Lovett, 1st Baronet, of Soulbury
- 10 February 1783: David de Visme, of Great Missenden
- 9 February 1784: Richard Scrimshire, of Amersham
- 7 February 1785: Thomas Saunders, of Brill
- 13 February 1786: Thomas Wilkinson, of Westhorpe
- 12 February 1787: Richard Dayrell, of Lillingstone Dayrell
- 8 February 1788: Stephen Langston, of Little Horwood
- 29 April 1789: Richard Davenport of Great Marlow
- 29 January 1790: John Hicks, of Braddenham
- 4 February 1791: Robert Bateson Harvey, of Langley Park
- 3 February 1792: William Pigott, of Doddershall
- 6 February 1793: Francis Peter Mallett, of Chalfont St. Peter
- 5 February 1794: Charles Clowes, of Iver
- 11 February 1795: Lovell Badcock, of Little Missenden
- 5 February 1796: Thomas Hibbert, of Chalfont House
- 1 February 1797: John Sullivan, of Richings Park
- 7 February 1798: John Penn, of Stoke Park
- 1 February 1799: George Morgan, of Biddlesden Park House

=== 1800–1899 ===
- 5 February 1800: Mansel Dawkin Mansel, of Lathbury House
- 11 February 1801: Edward Bury, of Iver
- 3 February 1802: James Oldham Oldham, of Missenden Abbey
- 3 February 1803: Joseph Franklin, of Haddenham
- 1 February 1804: Edward Nugent, of Lillies
- 8 February 1804: James Neild, of Stoke Hammond
- 6 February 1805: Edward Nugent, of Lillies
- 1 February 1806: James Backwell Praed, of Tyringham
- 7 February 1806: Philip Hoddle Ward, of Tickford Priory
- 4 February 1807: James Backwell Praed, of Tyringham
- 3 February 1808: Richard Dayrell, of Lillingstone Dayrell
- 6 February 1809: Thomas Stanhope Badcock, of Buckingham
- 31 January 1810: Sir William Clayton, 4th Baronet, of Harleyford
- 21 February 1810: John Ayton, of Missenden Abbey
- 8 February 1811: William Bernard-Morland, of Nether Winchendon
- 24 January 1812: Sir William Clayton, 4th Baronet, of Harleyford
- 14 February 1812: Christopher Salter, of Stoke Poges
- 10 February 1813: Thomas Cotton-Sheppard, of Thornton Hall
- 4 February 1814: Sir William Clayton, 4th Baronet, of Harleyford
- 13 February 1815: Thomas Digby Aubrey, of Chilton House
- 12 February 1816: Sir Thomas Tyringham Bernard, 6th Baronet, of Nether Winchendon
- 12 February 1817: George Carrington, of Missenden Abbey
- 24 January 1818: George Hassell, of Cholesbury
- 10 February 1819: John Grubb, of Horsenden
- 12 February 1820: Charles Shard, of Hedgerley
- 6 February 1821: Charles Scott Murray, of Hambleden House
- 4 February 1822: Benjamin Way, of Denham
- 31 January 1823: William Selby Lowndes, of Whaddon Hall
- 31 January 1824: Philip Duncombe Pauncefort-Duncombe, of Great Brickhill
- 2 February 1825: James Du Pré, of Wilton Park
- 30 January 1826: George Morgan, of Biddlesden Park House
- 5 February 1827: Thomas Saunders, of Aston Abbotts
- 13 February 1828: Robert Harvey, of Langley Park
- 11 February 1829: Henry William Mason, of Amersham
- 2 February 1830: Richard William Howard Vyse, of Stoke Place
- 31 January 1831: Henry Andrewes Uthwatt, of Great Linford
- 6 February 1832: Charles Spencer Ricketts, of Dorton House
- 1833: Charles Clowes, of Delaford Park
- 1834: George Simon Harcourt, of Ankerwyke House
- 1835: Sir Gore Ouseley, 1st Baronet, of Hall Barn Park
- 1836: Thomas Tyrwhitt-Drake of Shardeloes
- 1837: John Nembhard Hibbert, of Chalfont St Peter
- 1838: Rice Richard Clayton, of Hedgerley Park
- 1839: Benjamin Way, of Denham
- 1840: John Peter Deering, of the Lee
- 1841: Thomas Newland Allen, of the Vache
- 1842: John Palmer, of Dorney Court
- 1843: James Trevor Senior, of Broughton House
- 1844: John Barnes, of Chorley Wood
- 1845: Edmund Francis Dayrell, of Lillingstone Dayrell
- 1846: Sir William Clayton, 5th Baronet, of Harleyford House
- 1847: Mayer Amschel de Rothschild, of Mentmore Towers
- 1848: William Lowndes, of the Bury, Chesham
- 1849: John Kaye, of Fulmer
- 1850: William Selby Lowndes, of Whaddon Hall
- 1851: Richard Cavendish, of Thornton Hall
- 1852: Charles Robert Scott Murray, of Danesfield
- 1853: Abraham Darby IV, of Stoke Court
- 1854: Henry Hanmer, of Stockgrove Park, Soulbury
- 1855: Philip Duncombe Pauncefort Duncombe, of Great Brickhill
- 1856: William Frederick Farrer, of Brayfield House
- 1857: Philip Wroughton, of Ibstone
- 1858: Matthew Knapp, of Little Linford
- 1859: Thomas Tyrwhitt-Drake, of Shardeloes
- 1860: William Backwell Tyringham, of Tyringham Hall
- 1861: Sir Anthony de Rothschild, 1st Baronet, of Aston Clinton
- 1862: William Pennington, of Fernacres
- 1863: Philips Cosby Lovett, of Liscombe House
- 1864: Percy Barrington, 8th Viscount Barrington, of Westbury Manor
- 1865: Nathaniel Grace Lambert, of Denham Court
- 1866: Henry Arthur Hoare of Wavendon House
- 1867: Richard Henry Richard Howard-Vyse, of Stoke Place,
- 1868: James Carson, of Spinfield, in Great Marlow,
- 1869: Abraham John Robarts, of Lillingston Dayrell
- 1870: John Pattison Ellames, of the Manor House, Little Marlow
- 1871: Christopher Tower, of Huntsmoor Park
- 1872: Richard Rose, of The Chestnuts, Aylesbury
- 1873: James Edward McConnell, of The Woodlands, Great Missenden
- 1874: Lawrence Robert Hall, of Foscott Manor
- 1875: George Hanbury, of Blythewood, Hitcham
- 1876: Sir William Robert Clayton, 6th Baronet of Harleyford, Great Marlow
- 1877: William Schoolcroft Burton, of Walton Hall
- 1878: Sir Philip Rose, 1st Baronet of Rayners
- 1879: Edward John Coleman, of Stoke Park, Buckinghamshire
- 1880: Henry Cazenove, of Lilies, Hardwick-cum-Weedon
- 1881: James Watson, of Langley House, Langley Marish, near Slough
- 1882: John Edward Bartlett, of Peverel Court, Aylesbury
- 1883: Ferdinand von Rothschild of Lodge Hill, Waddesdon
- 1884: Samuel Richard Brewis, of Ibstone House, Tetsworth
- 1885: Lewis Duval Hall, of Farnham Chase, Farnham Royal, Slough
- 1886: Edward Levy-Lawson, 1st Baron Burnham of Hall Barn, Beaconsfield
- 1887: Charles Meeking, of Richings Park, Colnbrook
- 1888: Edward Dent, of Femacres, Fulmer, Slough
- 1889: William Henry Grenfell, of Taplow Court, Maidenhead
- 1890: Charles Aloysius Scott-Murray, of Danesfield, Marlow
- 1891: Harold William Swithinbank, of Denham Court, Denham
- 1892: Wilberforce Bryant, of Stoke Park, Slough
- 1893: Stafford O'Brien Hoare, of Turville Park
- 1894: Samuel Sandars, of the Grove, Chalfont St. Giles (died in office), succeeded by Francis Culling Carr-Gomm, of Farnham Chase, Slough
- 1895: Capt. William Farwell, of the Priory, Burnham
- 1896: Capt. Frederick Thomas Penton, of Chalfont Park, Slough
- 1897: Maj. Alexander Finlay, of the Manor House, Little Brickhill
- 1898: Sir Phillip Frederick Rose, 2nd Baronet, of Rayners, Penn, Amersham
- 1899: Arthur Lasenby Liberty, of the Manor House, the Lee, Great Missenden

=== 1900–1973 ===
- 1900: Sir Robert Grenville Harvey, 2nd Baronet, of Langley Park, Slough
- 1901: Rudolph Chambers Lehmann, of Fieldhead, Bourne End
- 1902: Frederick George Lloyd, of Langley House, Langley
- 1903: Robert William Hudson, of Danesfield, Marlow
- 1904: Charles Taylor, of Horton Manor, Slough
- 1905: Alfred Gilbey, of Wooburn House, Wooburn Green
- 1906: Colonel Philip Edward Pope, of The Grange, Datchet, Windsor.
- 1907: Lieutenant-Colonel Peter Broome Giles, of Holne Chase, Bletchley.
- 1908: Lieutenant-Colonel William Duncan, of Shenley Park, Bletchley.
- 1909: Sir Herbert Samuel Leon of Bletchley Park, Bletchley
- 1910: Norman McCorquodale, of Winslow Hall, Winslow
- 1911: William Baring du Pré of Taplow House, Taplow
- 1912: Alfred Ernest Skinner, of Grendon Hall, Aylesbury
- 1913: Augustus Henry Eden Allhusen
- 1914: Henry John Turner, of Braziers End, Cholesbury, Tring
- 1915: Henry Rodolph de Salis, of Ivy Lodge, Iver Heath, Uxbridge
- 1916: Sir John Charles Bell, 1st Baronet of Framewood, Stoke Poges
- 1917: Henry Hugo Worthington, of Wycombe Court, High Wycombe
- 1918: John Bell White, of Alderbourne Manor, Gerrards Cross
- 1919: Hubert George Beaumont of Wotton House, Aylesbury
- 1920: Sir John Frecheville Ramsden, of Bulstrode, Gerrards Cross
- 1921: Lieut.-Col. Michael Augustus Tighe, of Loosley House, Princes Risborough
- 1922: Captain Ivor Stewart-Liberty, of The Lee, Great Missenden
- 1923: Sir William Borradaile Savory, 3rd Baronet, of The Woodlands, Stoke Poges
- 1924: Lieut.-Col. Francis Tyringham Higgins-Bernard, of Nether Winchendon Priory, Aylesbury
- 1925: Sir Henry Aubrey-Fletcher, 6th Baronet, of Brill House, Brill
- 1926: Capt. William Henry Lambton, of Kedfield, Winslow
- 1927: Edward Thomas Tyrwhitt-Drake, of Shardeloes, Amersham
- 1928: Major Thomas Sutton Timmis, of The Grove, Walton, Aylesbury
- 1929: Sir Gomer Berry, 1st Baronet. of The Chase, Farnham Royal
- 1930: Percy Noble, of Taplow Priory
- 1931: Major Coningsby Ralph Disraeli, of Hughenden Manor, High Wycombe
- 1932: Lieut.-Col. Frederick Henry Allhusen of Fulmer House, Fulmer
- 1933: Col. Sir Courtauld Thomson, of Dorney Wood House, Burnham
- 1934: Sir John Lindsay Dashwood, 10th Baronet, of West Wycombe Park, West Wycombe
- 1935: Col. Stanley Leonard Barry, of Long Crendon Manor, Long Crendon
- 1936: Edward Clifton-Brown, of Burnham Grove, Burnham
- 1937: Sir Nigel Leslie Campbell, of Woodrow High House, Amersham
- 1938: Major-General Sir Richard Granville Hylton Howard-Vyse, of Stoke Place, Stoke Poges
- 1939: Lieut.-Col. William Selby Lowndes, of Whaddon Hall, Bletchley
- 1940: Major Sir Reginald Bonsor, 2nd Baronet of Liscombe Park, Leighton Buzzard, Beds.
- 1941: Shirley Sutton Timmis, of Butlers Court, Beaconsfield
- 1942: Major Thomas Close-Smith, of Boycott Manor, Buckingham
- 1943: Major Harold Trestrail Morton, of The Old House, Aston Abbotts, Aylesbury
- 1944: Lieut.-Colonel William Francis Challinor, of Harleyford Manor, Marlow
- 1945: A. Noel Mobbs, of Stoke Park, Slough
- 1946: Sir William Crawford Currie, of Dinton Hall, Aylesbury
- 1947: Colonel Francis William Watson, of Glebe House, Dinton, Aylesbury
- 1948: Colonel Cecil Llewellyn Samuelson, of Rose Hill, Burnham
- 1949: Sir Everard Pauncefort Duncombe, 3rd Baronet. of Great Brickhill Manor, Bletchley
- 1950: Col. Oscar Vaughan Viney of Green End House, Aylesbury
- 1951: Lt.-Col. Philip Dayrell Stewart Palmer of Dorney Court, Dorney
- 1952: Norman William Gurney of Woodlands, Beaconsfield
- 1953: Brig. Eric Greville Earle of Walton Hall, Bletchley
- 1954: Maj. Christopher Lionel Hanbury of Juniper Hill, Burnham
- 1955: Edward Henry Dulley of Datchet Court, Datchet
- 1956: Lt.-Col. Leonard Tetley of Bacombe Warren, Wendover
- 1957: Maj. Ralph Bruce Verney of Claydon House,Middle Claydon
- 1958: Vice-Adm. Richard Shelley of The Pickeridge, Stoke Poges
- 1959: Cyril Cobham Griffith of Stoke Lodge, Stoke Poges
- 1960: John Darling Young of Thornton Hall, Bletchley
- 1961: Sir John Aubrey-Fletcher, 7th Baronet of the Gate House, Chilton
- 1962: Gerald Aubrey Mobbs of Bramleys, Little Kingshill, Great Missenden
- 1963: David John Robarts of The Glebe House, Lillingstone Lovell. Buckingham.
- 1964: Elliott Merriam Viney of Green End House, Aylesbury
- 1965: Noel Stephen Paynter of Lawn House, Edgcott
- 1966: Sir Henry Roderick Moore of Bourton Grounds, Buckingham
- 1967: John Hubert Emlyn Jones of Ivinghoe Manor, Leighton Buzzard, Bedfordshire
- 1968: Owen Francis MacTier Wethered of Remnantz, Marlow
- 1969: John Fremantle of The Old House, Swanboume, Bletchley
- 1970: Laurence Bowring Stoddart of The Manor House, Cheddington
- 1971: Leslie Sydney Marler of Bolebec House, Whitchurch
- 1972: Ernest John Routly of Pargrove, Frieth, Henley-on-Thames
- 1973: Roger Parker-Jervis of Longdown House, Cadsden, Aylesbury

== List of high sheriffs ==
=== 1974—1999 ===
- 1974–1975: John Patrick Martin-Bates of Ivy Cottage, Fingest, near Henley on Thames, Oxfordshire
- 1975–1976: June Elisabeth Micklem, of Maynes Hill, Hoggeston, Winslow
- 1976–1977: Sir Francis Dashwood, 11th Baronet of West Wycombe Park, High Wycombe
- 1977–1978: John Leslie Garton, of Fingest Manor, Henley on Thames.
- 1978–1979: John Mower Alexander Paterson of Park Hill, Great Missenden
- 1979–1980: Ralph Charles Yablon of Willow Bank, Church Street, Buckingham
- 1980–1981: David Richard Michael Curling, of The Rosary, Coleshill, Amersham
- 1981–1982: Dorrien Berkeley Euan Belson, of Stayes, Northend, Henley-on-Thames
- 1982–1983: Sir Gerald Nigel Mobbs of Widmer Lodge, Lacey Green, Aylesbury
- 1983–1984: Edna Dorothy Embleton of Mel Valley, Stowe
- 1984–1985: Greville Selby-Lowndes, of Langley Cottage, Fulmer, Slough
- 1985–1986: Victor Gerard Alexander Hoare Nairne of Turville Park, Henley-on-Thames
- 1986–1987: George Langton Kendall of The Turnery, North Dean, near Hughenden, High Wycombe
- 1987–1988: Sir Philip Pauncefort-Duncombe, 4th Baronet of Great Brickhill Manor, Milton Keynes
- 1988–1989: Alistair Francis MacLeod Matthews of The Manor House, Chenies, by Rickmansworth, Hertfordshire
- 1989–1990: Thomas Arthur Bird of Turville Heath House, Turville Heath, Henley-on-Thames
- 1990–1991: Sir Peter Reynolds of Rignall Farm, Rignall Road, Great Missenden
- 1991–1992: Christopher Prideaux of Doddershall, Quainton, Aylesbury
- 1992–1993: Catharine Margaret, Lady Popplewell, of Lime Tree Farm, Chartridge, Chesham
- 1993–1994: David Vereker Palmer, of Burrow Farm, Hambleden
- 1994–1995: John Michael Wheeler, of Sly Corner, Lee Common, Great Missenden
- 1995–1996: Sir Henry Aubrey-Fletcher, 8th Baronet of Town Hill Farm, Chilton, Aylesbury
- 1996–1997: Richard Egerton Morris-Adams of Leap Hill, Brill, Aylesbury
- 1997–1998: Denis James Burrell of Denham Mount, Denham
- 1998–1999: Edmund Ralph Verney of Claydon House, Middle Claydon, Buckingham
- 1999–2000: Sir William McAlpine, 6th Baronet of Fawley House, Fawley, near Henley-on-Thames

=== 2000–present ===
- 2000–2001: Martin Hubert Thomas Jourdan of Wapping, Long Crendon, Aylesbury
- 2001–2002: Alexander David Shephard, Stonehouse, Penn
- 2002–2003: Rupert Carington, The Manor House, Bledlow, Aylesbury
- 2003–2004: Richard Godber, Hall Farm, Little Linford, Milton Keynes
- 2004–2005: Francis Patrick Strain Phillips, Upper Farmhouse, Upton, Aylesbury
- 2005–2006: Jennifer Hopkirk of Parsonage Farm, Penn
- 2006–2007: Alexander Boswell of North Crawley
- 2007–2008: Amanda Rose Nicholson of Buckingham
- 2008–2009: Peter John Thorogood of Buckingham
- 2009–2010: Allan Thomas Westray of Butlers Cross, Aylesbury
- 2010–2011: Elizabeth Curzon, Countess Howe
- 2011–2012: James Philip Godfrey Naylor, of Cublington, Leighton Buzzard
- 2012–2013: (Alison) Carolyn Cumming of Maids Moreton, Buckingham
- 2013–2014: Sir Stuart Hampson of Bledlow Ridge
- 2014–2015: Joseph Gurney Barclay of Great White End, Latimer, Chesham
- 2015–2016: (Anna) Francesca Skelton of Great Linford, Milton Keynes
- 2016–2017: Camilla Rose Soames of Cuddington, Aylesbury
- 2017–2018: Peter Bhupatsing Kara of Bletchley
- 2018–2019: Ruth Sarah Farwell, of High Wycombe
- 2019–2020: Julia Anne Upton of Little Linford, Milton Keynes
- 2020–2021: Andrew David Farncombe of Beaconsfield
- 2021–2022: George Rupert Anson of Weedon
- 2022-2023: Debbie Brock of Emberton
- 2023-2024: Dame Ann Geraldine Limb of Stony Stratford
- 2024–2025: Kurshida Begum Mirza of Milton Keynes
- 2025–2026: Philippa Jane Kirkbride of Amersham
- 2026–2027: Nicola Heather Ross of Tingewick

== See also ==
- High Sheriff of Bedfordshire and Buckinghamshire

== Bibliography ==
- "highsheriffofbuckinghamshire.co.uk".
- "A History of the County of Buckingham: Volume 3".
- Hughes, A. (1898). List of Sheriffs for England and Wales from the Earliest Times to A.D. 1831. London: Eyre & Spottiswoode. (with amendments of 1963, Public Record Office)
- Willis, Browne (1755). The History and Antiquities of the Town, Hundred and Deanry of Buckingham. London.
