= Alexander Robert Badcock =

Officer in the British Indian Army

General Sir Alexander Robert Badcock KCB CSI
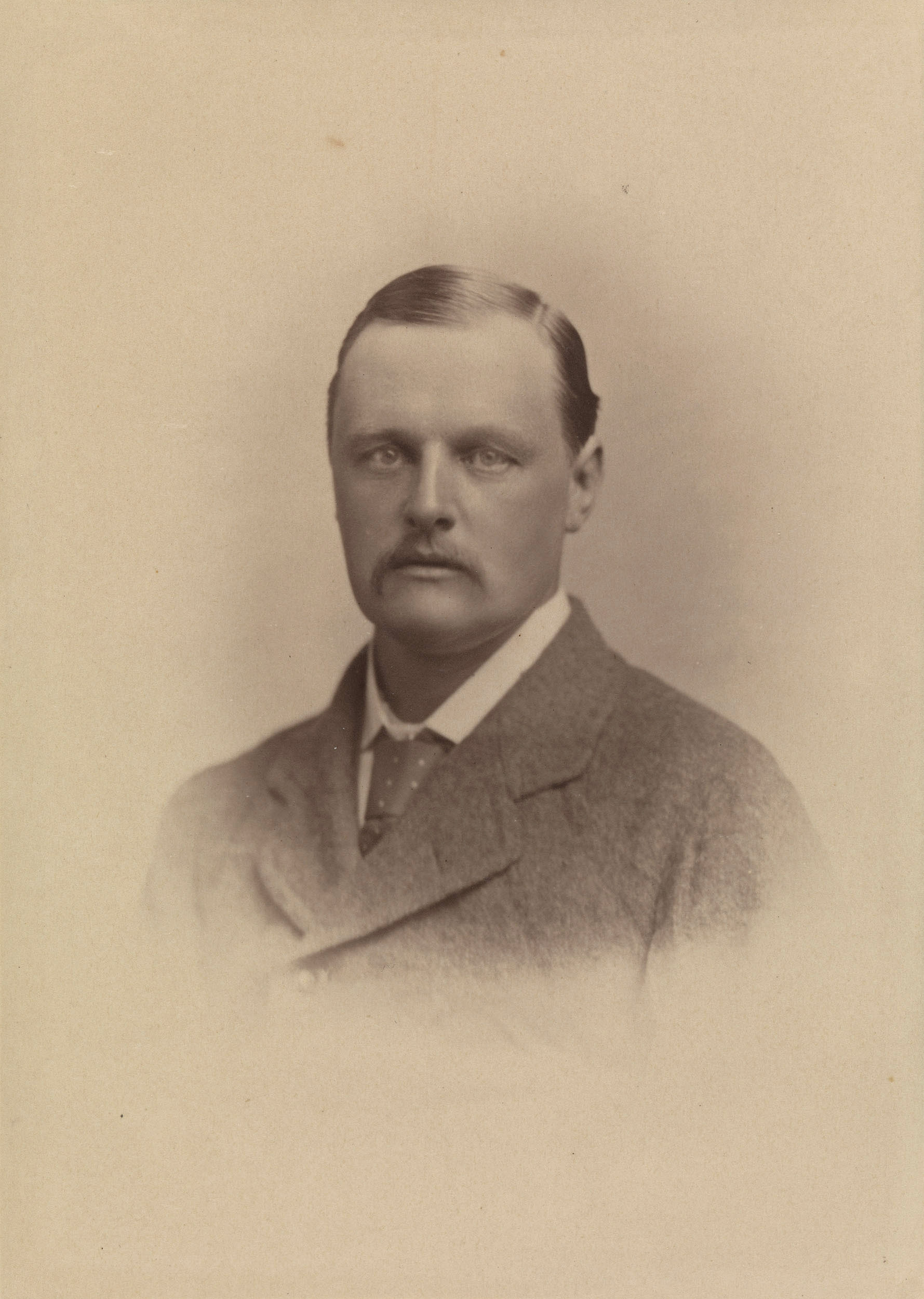
- Badcock c. 1879
- Born: 11 January 1844; Taunton, Somerset, England
- Died: 23 March 1907 (aged 63)
- Military career
- Allegiance: United Kingdom
- Branch: British Indian Army
- Rank: General
- Awards: Knight Commander of the Order of the Bath; Companion of the Order of the Star of India

General Sir Alexander Robert Badcock, KCB, CSI (11 January 1844 – 23 March 1907) was a general in the British Indian Army. He joined the infantry in 1861 and transferred to the commissariat in 1864 as a lieutenant. Badcock served in the Bhutan War (1864–5), the Black Mountain Expedition (1868), and Perak War (1875–6) and was principal commissariat officer for the Kurram Valley Field Forceduring the Second Afghan War (1878–9). For his logistical work in the latter he was appointed a companion of the Order of the Bath. Badcock afterwards served on the Mahdist War in Sudan and the Chitral Relief Force for his work in which he was appointed a companion of the Order of the Star of India. Badcock became quartermaster-general in 1895 before returning to England in 1900. There he helped organise the Imperial Yeomanry and served on the Council of India. He was appointed a knight commander of the Order of the Bath in 1902.

== Life ==
Badcock was educated at Harrow School, the son of Henry Badcock (1801–1888), a Taunton banker. His grandfather, Isaac Badcock and his great-uncle, John Badcock had founded "Badcock's Bank" at Taunton in 1800, which later became known as "Stuckey's Bank" and then the Westminster Bank.

He obtained his first commission as ensign on 1 October 1861, was promoted lieutenant on 1 October 1862 and captain on 1 October 1873, brevet-colonel on 2 March 1885, major-general on 1 April 1897, lieutenant-general on 3 April 1900.

After a brief period of regimental duty with the 38th Foot and then the 29th Bengal Native Infantry, he entered the Indian commissariat department in 1864, where he remained till 1895, rising to the highest post of commissary general-in-chief, December 1890.

In his three earliest campaigns, Bhutan War (1864–5), the Black Mountain Expedition (1868), and Perak (1875–6) he attracted notice for his foresight and power of organisation, winning the thanks of the government. His next service was as principal commissariat officer under Major-General Frederick Roberts in the Kurram Valley Field Force (1878–9) during the Second Afghan War, taking part in the battle of Peiwar Kotal and other actions. Returning from furlough when operations were resumed in late 1879, he joined the Kabul Field Force, and owing to his preparations, Lord Roberts found in the Sherpur Cantonment when it was invested: 'supplies for men stored for nearly four months and for animals for six weeks.'

Badcock also assisted in recovering the guns abandoned near Bhagwana, and finally when the Kabul-Kandahar Field Force, consisting of 9,986 men and eighteen guns with 8,000 followers and 2,300 horses and mules, started on 9 August 1880 he relieved Roberts's 'greatest anxiety,' and the force reached Kandahar, 313 miles from Kabul, on 31 August, with a safe margin of supplies. For these services he received the Afghanistan Medal and three clasps, the bronze Kabul to Kandahar Star, brevets of major and lieutenant-colonel, and made a companion of the Order of the Bath (CB). Roberts reported to the government that he knew of 'no officer so well qualified as Major Badcock to be placed at the head of the commissariat in the field.'

In 1885, Badcock collected transport for the Sudan, and in 1895 was made a companion of the Order of the Star of India (CSI), and the thanks of the government for his services in connection with the Chitral Relief Force. He was appointed quartermaster-general in India on 7 November 1895, and promoted to major-general on 1 April 1897. Besides these appointments he acted as secretary in the military department 1890–1 and was president of a committee to consider the grant of compensation for the dearness of provisions, October 1894.

He was promoted to lieutenant-general on 3 April 1900, shortly before returning to the United Kingdom on his retirement at the expiration of his term of office as quartermaster-general later in 1900. On his return he took an active part in the organisation of the Imperial Yeomanry, and was appointed member of the Secretary of State's Council of India. He became a knight commander of the Order of the Bath (KCB) in the 1902 Coronation Honours list published on 26 June 1902, and invested as such by King Edward VII at Buckingham Palace on 24 October 1902.

He died in London on 23 March 1907, while still a member of the Council of India, and was buried at Taunton.

== Family ==
He married in 1865, Theophila Lowther, daughter of John Shore Dumergue, I.C.S., judge of Aligarh, by whom he had four sons and a daughter. All his sons entered the army. Sir Alexander appears in the picture of officers who took part in the Kabul–Kandahar march published by Major Whitelock of Birmingham in 1911.
