= William Stanhope Badcock =

Royal Navy officer (1788–1859)

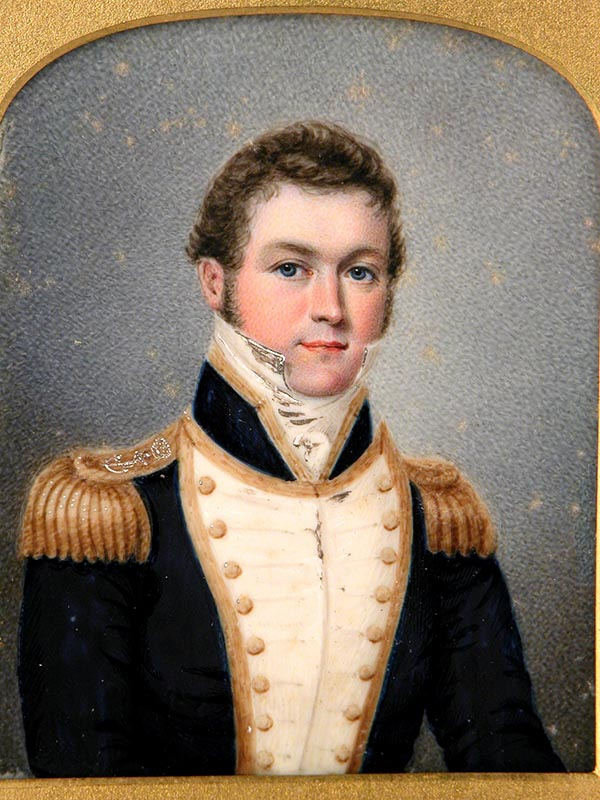
1838 portrait of Lovell

Vice-Admiral William Stanhope Lovell, KH (born William Stanhope Badcock; 1788 – 20 May 1859) was a Royal Navy officer and a descendant of Sir Salathiel Lovell.

He was the eldest son of Thomas Stanhope Badcock of Little Missenden Abbey, Buckinghamshire and Maplethorpe Hall, Lincolnshire.

He served under Lord Nelson at Trafalgar in 1805 and was present at the capture of Washington in 1814.

He was married, in 1822, to Selina, daughter of Sir Henry Harpur Crewe of Calke Abbey, Derbyshire.

He and his elder brother, Lovell Benjamin Badcock, changed their name of Badcock to Lovell by sign-manual in 1840.
