= Fleetwood (surname) =

Fleetwood is an English surname. Notable people with the surname include:

- Adam Fleetwood, British racing driver
- Charles Fleetwood (died 1692), English Parliamentary General and Lord Deputy of Ireland
- Charles Fleetwood (theatre manager) (died 1747), manager of the Theatre Royal, Drury Lane
- Christian Fleetwood (1840–1914), American army officer
- Daniel M. Fleetwood (born 1958), American engineer
- Elisabeth Fleetwood (1927–2024), Swedish politician.
- Folke Fleetwood (1890–1949), Swedish Olympic discus thrower
- Francis Fleetwood (1946–2015), American architect
- Frederick G. Fleetwood (1868–1938), U.S. politician, representative from Vermont
- Sir George Fleetwood (regicide) (c. 1623 – c. 1672), English soldier, signatory of King Charles I's death warrant
- George Fleetwood (disambiguation), several people
- Gerard Fleetwood (before 1604 – after 1650), member of the House of Commons of England
- Henry Fleetwood (disambiguation), several people
- Hugh Fleetwood (born 1944), British writer and painter
- James Fleetwood (1603–1683), Bishop of Worcester
- John Fleetwood (disambiguation), several people
- Marquel Fleetwood (born 1970), American football player
- Mick Fleetwood (born 1947), drummer for rock band Fleetwood Mac
- Miles Fleetwood (died 1641), member of the House of Commons of England
- Nicole R. Fleetwood, professor of American Studies and Art History at Rutgers University
- Richard Fleetwood (1653–1709), member of the House of Commons of England for Lancashire (1704–1705)
- Roy Fleetwood (born 1946), British architect and designer
- Sara Iredell Fleetwood (1849–1908), American nurse and clubwoman
- Steve Fleetwood (born 1962), English football player and manager
- Stuart Fleetwood, Welsh footballer
- Susan Fleetwood (1944–1995), English actor, sister of Mick Fleetwood
- Thomas Fleetwood (disambiguation), several people
- Tommy Fleetwood (born 1991), English golfer
- Victoria Fleetwood (born 1990), English rugby union player
- William Fleetwood (disambiguation), several people
- Chuck Fleetwood-Smith (1908–1971), Australian cricketer
- Bernard Fleetwood-Walker (1893–1965), English artist
- Sir Peter Hesketh-Fleetwood (1801–1866), English landowner and MP, founder of Fleetwood, Lancashire, England
