= George Fleetwood =

George Fleetwood may refer to:

- George Fleetwood (regicide) (1623–1674), English Major-General and one of the Regicides of King Charles I of England
- George Fleetwood (Swedish general) (1605–1667), Englishman who became a Swedish general and baron
- George Fleetwood (priest), Archdeacon of Totnes in 1713
- George Fleetwood (Tavistock MP) (1564–1620), English politician

== See also ==
- Fleetwood baronets
- Fleetwood (noble family), mentions several other George Fleetwoods
