= Fleetwood family =

The Fleetwood family may refer to:

- Fleetwood (noble family), a Swedish baronial family, originally from England
- Fleetwood baronets, two baronetcies created for members of the Fleetwood family; one branch from Staffordshire and one from Lancashire, England
