= Fleetwood (disambiguation) =

Fleetwood is a town in Lancashire, England.

Fleetwood may also refer to:

== Places ==
=== Canada ===
- Fleetwood, Surrey, British Columbia

=== United States ===
- Fleetwood, Pennsylvania, borough in Berks County, Pennsylvania
- Fleetwood, a neighborhood in the US city of Mt. Vernon, New York
  - Fleetwood (Metro-North station), a railroad station located in that neighborhood
- Fleetwood Park Racetrack, a defunct horse racing track in New York City, New York

== People ==
- Fleetwood (surname)
- Bernard Fleetwood-Walker (1893–1965), English artist and painting teacher
- Moses Fleetwood Walker (1857–1924), American baseball player
- Fleetwood (noble family), Swedish Baronial family
- Fleetwood baronets
- Fleetwood Pellew (1789–1861), British Royal Navy admiral
- Mick Fleetwood (born 1947), British musician and co-founder of Fleetwood Mac
- Tommy Fleetwood (born 1991), English professional golfer

== Ships and boats ==
- HMS Fleetwood, name of two ships of the British Royal Navy
- Fleetwood (steamboat), steamboat that once ran on Columbia River and Puget Sound

== Other uses ==
- Fleetwood (novel), a novel by William Godwin
- Fleetwood Metal Body, automobile coachbuilder
  - Cadillac Fleetwood Brougham
  - Cadillac Fleetwood
- The Fleetwoods, singing trio from Olympia, Washington, USA
- Fleetwood Mac, British and American rock band and the name of two albums
  - Fleetwood Mac (1968 album)
  - Fleetwood Mac (1975 album)
- Fleetwood—Port Kells, Canadian federal electoral district
- Blackpool North and Fleetwood (UK Parliament constituency)
- Fleetwood Enterprises, U.S. manufacturer
- Fleetwood Town F.C., football club in Fleetwood, England

== See also ==
- Threepwood (disambiguation)
