= David Clarkson (minister) =

English ejected minister

David Clarkson (1622 – 14 June 1686) was an English ejected minister.

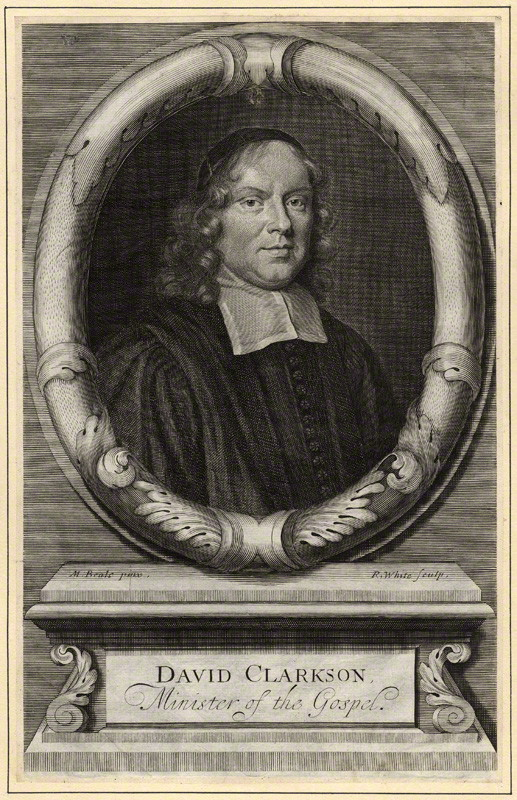
David Clarkson

== Early life ==
The son of Robert Clarkson, he was born at Bradford, Yorkshire, where he was baptised on 3 March 1622. His brother, William Clarkson, held the sequestered rectory of Adel, Leeds, and died not long before the Restoration. His sister was married to Sharp, uncle of Bishop John Sharp and father of Thomas Sharp, the ejected minister.

He was educated at Clare Hall, Cambridge, and by virtue of a warrant from the Earl of Manchester was admitted fellow on 5 May 1645, being then B.A. Clarkson had pupils until 26 March 1650, among them John Tillotson, who succeeded him in his fellowship about 27 November 1651.

== Career ==
Clarkson obtained the perpetual curacy of Mortlake, Surrey, and held it till his ejection by the Uniformity Act 1662. After two decades of covert movement he became, in July 1682, colleague to John Owen as pastor of an independent church in London, and on Owen's death in the following year he succeeded him as sole pastor. In 1685 he was at The Vache with Edward Terry, Samuel Cradock and Hester Fleetwood.

== Death ==
David Clarkson died rather suddenly on 14 June 1686, and his funeral sermon was preached by William Bates.

== Works ==
Clarkson published:

- The Practical Divinity of the Papists proved destructive to Christianity, 1672.
- Animadversions upon the Speeches of the Five Jesuits, 1679.
- No Evidence for Diocesan Churches or any Bishops without the Choice or Consent of the People in the Primitive Times, 1681. In reply to Edward Stillingfleet.
- Diocesan Churches not yet discovered in the Primitive Times, 1682, in support of the previous work.

Posthumous were:

- A Discourse of the Saving Grace of God, 1688 (preface by John Howe).
- Primitive Episcopacy, 1688; reissued 1689 (answered by Henry Maurice, in Defence of Diocesan Episcopacy,’ 1691).
- A Discourse concerning Liturgies, 1689 (French translation, Rotterdam, 1716).
- Sermons and Discourses on several Divine Subjects, 1696. This is one of the folio volumes sometimes found in old dissenting chapels, originally attached by a chain to a reading-desk (e.g. at Lydgate, Hinckley, Coventry).
- Funeral Sermon for John Owen, D.D., 1720, and in Owen's Collection of Sermons, 1721.

Clarkson also contributed sermons to Samuel Annesley's Morning Exercise at Cripplegate, 1661, and to Nathaniel Vincent's Morning Exercise against Popery, 1675. His Select Works were edited for the Wycliffe Society by Basil Henry Cooper and John Blackburn, 1846.

== Personal life ==
Clarkson married, firstly, Lady Elizabeth Holcroft, daughter of Sir Henry Holcroft (1586–1650) and his wife Lettice Aungier (daughter of Francis Aungier, 1st Baron Aungier of Longford), and sister of Francis Holcroft, who died c.1671 leaving two daughters. He married, secondly, Gertrude who outlived him.

The children of the first marriage were:

- Cornelia Clarkson
- Lettice Clarkson
- Matthew Clarkson (1665–1702), who served as Secretary of New York and married in 1692 Catharine Van Schayck (1670–1702). They had five children, and were ancestors of Thomas S. Clarkson who Clarkson University is named after.

Thomas Ridgley's funeral sermon for Clarkson's daughter Gertrude was printed in 1701.
