= Samuel Cradock =

Samuel Cradock, B.D. (1621?–1706) was a nonconformist tutor, who was born about 1621. He was an elder brother of Zachary Cradock.

== Education ==
Cradock entered Emmanuel College, Cambridge, as a pensioner (fee-paying student) from Rutland, and was elected fellow of Emmanuel in 1645. He was a noted tutor there, and had many pupils. On 10 October 1649 he was incorporated M.A. at Oxford. His public performance on taking his B.D. in 1651 at Cambridge was 'highly applauded', says Calamy. He resigned his fellowship in 1656 on accepting the college living of North Cadbury, Somersetshire. Here he devoted himself "most assiduously" to the work of the ministry, till he was ejected by the Act of Uniformity 1662.

== Life ==
By the death of George Cradock he had become next heir male to Walter Cradock of Geesings, in the parish of Wickhambrook, Suffolk, who, dying shortly after Cradock's ejectment, left him his estate. Hereupon he took as his motto, Nec ingratus nec inutilis videar vixisse. Some years later he took his family to Geesings, and on the Royal Declaration of Indulgence (15 March 1672) he obtained a license (2 April) for himself as a 'presbyterian teacher,' and for his house as a place of worship.

In 1685 he was at The Vache with Edward Terry, David Clarkson and Hester Fleetwood.

For twenty-four years he continued his ministrations gratuitously, living in good style as a country gentleman, and on excellent terms with Cowper, the vicar of Wickhambrook. He was never molested, and even when he opened under his own roof, prior to the Toleration Act 1689, an academy for training young men in philosophy and theology, he escaped the interferences with which other nonconformist tutors were visited. Sons of presbyterian peers and gentry frequented his academy. Edmund Calamy, who was his pupil in philosophy (1686–8), gives a list, not exhaustive, of twelve who were his contemporaries, including his classmate Timothy Goodwin, then studying with a view to medicine, eventually promoted to the archbishopric of Cashel.

The question arose whether nonconformist tutors were not violating their graduation oaths by prelecting outside the universities. Cradock drew up his reasons for believing that the oath referred simply to lectures in order to a degree. He drew up a paper in his own defence, which was afterwards published by Calamy. All the early nonconformist tutors lectured in Latin. Cradock's lectures were compilations, the systematic arrangement being his own; each student was expected to transcribe them. Calamy speaks very highly of the moral effect of Cradock's discipline, which was wise and friendly, and not too severe. The tutor was a pleasant and genial man, who enlivened his conversation with a spice of humour. Provision having been made on an adjoining estate in 1695 for the performance of dissenting worship at Wickhambrook, Cradock moved in 1696 to Bishop's Stortford, where he continued to preach, and soon became pastor of a congregational church in the neighbouring village of Stansted Mountfitchet (meeting-house erected about 1698). He was able to preach twice every Sunday till within a fortnight of his death on 7 October 1706, in his eighty-sixth year. He was buried at Wickhambrook on 11 October. A week later Samuel Bury delivered a funeral oration.

== Works ==
Cradock published:

- 'Knowledge and Practice,' 1659, 8vo; reprinted, 1673, 4to; supplement, 1679, 4to; enlarged edition, 1702, fol. (portrait). Dedication to master and fellows of Emmanuel, dated 5 May 1659; recommendatory epistle by Edward Reynolds, afterwards bishop of Norwich; written for his congregation at North Cadbury, and a copy presented to every parishioner; Doddridge and Orton speak of it, with reason, as one of the best manuals for a young minister.
- 'The Harmony of the Four Evangelists,' 1668, fol.; reprinted 1669, 1670, 1684, 1685 (revised by Tillotson, whose 'care had preserved it from the flames' in September 1666, during the great fire).
- 'A Catechism,' 1668 (Palmer).
- 'The Apostolical History,' 1672, fol. reprinted 1673.
- 'A Serious Dissuasive from . . . Sins of the Times,' 1679, 4to.
- 'The History of the Old Testament methodized,' 1683, fol.; reprinted 1695, translated into Latin, Leyden, 1685, 8vo.
- 'A Plain and Brief Exposition and Paraphrase on the Revelation,' 1690, 8vo; reprinted 1692, 1696.

== Sources ==
Attribution

This article incorporates text from a publication now in the public domain: Stephen, Leslie, ed. (1887). "Cradock, Samuel". Dictionary of National Biography. Vol. 12. London: Smith, Elder & Co.
