= Fleetwood Walker =

Fleetwood Walker could refer to:

- Bernard Fleetwood-Walker, English artist
- Moses Fleetwood Walker, African-American baseball player

== See also ==
- Fleetwood (disambiguation)
- Walker (disambiguation)
