= John Blackburn (minister) =

English Congregationalist minister (1792–1855)

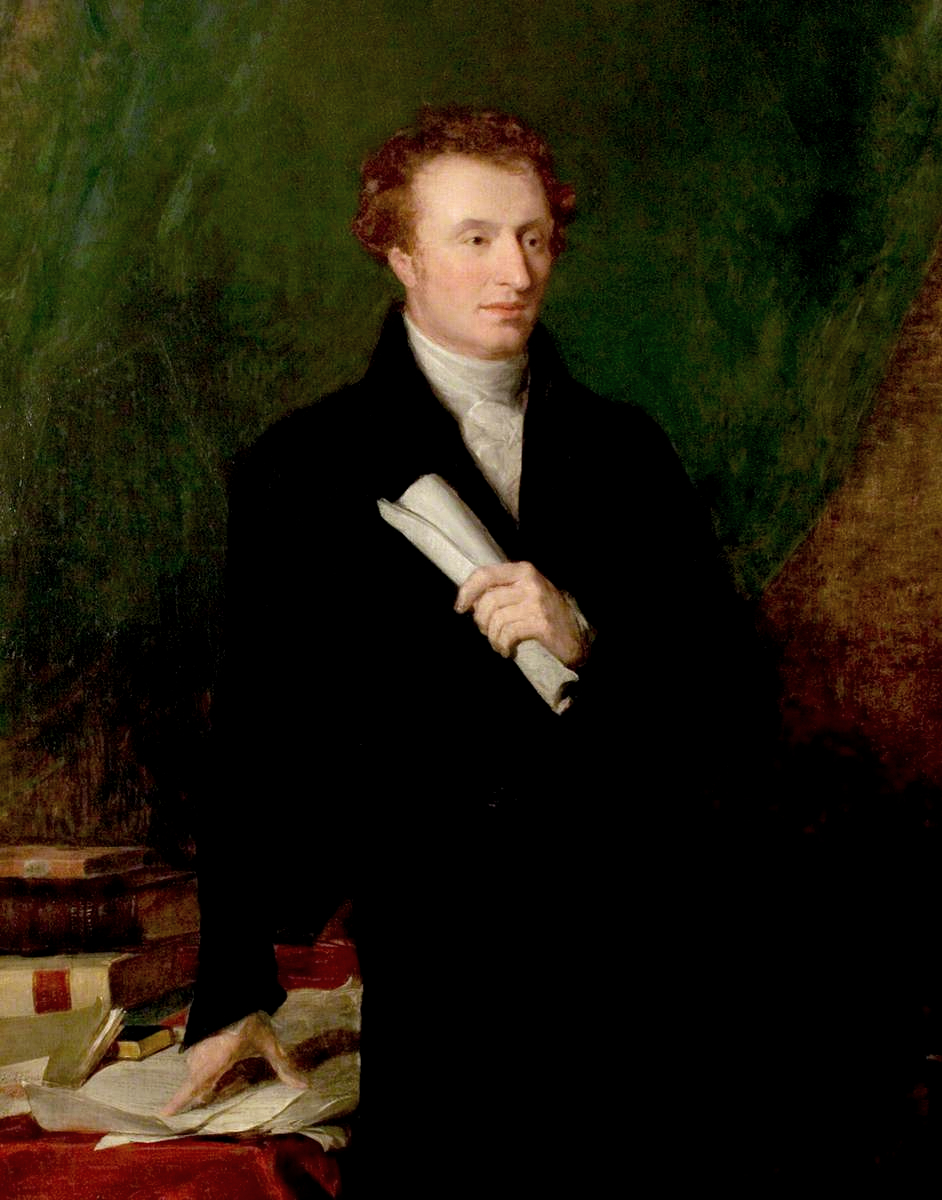
- John Blackburn
- Born: 1792; London, England
- Died: June 16, 1855 (aged 62–63); London, England
- Resting place: Abney Park Cemetery
- Occupation: Congregationalist minister
- Known for: Leadership in the Congregational movement

John Blackburn (1792–1855) was an English Congregationalist minister, for many years at Claremont Chapel, London. He was a prominent, conservative leader of the Congregational movement.

== Life ==
He was born to a religious family in the Minories, London. His father John Blackburn (died 1834) made scales, and belonged to a livery company.

In early life Blackburn entered the Baptist College, Stepney, but then switched to Hoxton Academy. He worked for the Irish Evangelical Society, in Sligo. He then became pastor at Finchingfield, from 1815.

In 1822, Blackburn became minister at the Claremont Chapel, Pentonville Road, London. His congregation included Thomas Wilson, who had had the chapel built, and Hugh Owen.

Blackburn was Secretary of the Congregational Union of England and Wales, 1834–1847, and of the Christian Instruction Society. He supported the Church of Ireland; and was an opponent of the British Anti-State Church Association formed in the 1840s, writing against it in the Congregational Magazine, which he edited from 1818 to 1845. The Wyclyffe Society (or Wiclyffe) he founded in the 1840s, a text publication society for the works of John Wyclif, did not get further than one volume, edited by Robert Vaughan; and was later disparaged by Harold Herbert Williams. The Wyclif Society (1882–1925) printed all Wyclif's works.

Blackburn married the second daughter of Robert Smith of Beslyns, Great Bardfield.

In 1848, Blackburn was made an inspector of the Congregational chapels in Wales, with Henry Richard. In 1849, he was in Maidstone Gaol, as a debtor.

On 16 June 1855, John Blackburn died. He was buried in Abney Park.

== Works ==
- Reflections on the Moral and Spiritual Claims of the Metropolis (1827)
- The True Character and Probable Results of American Revivals (1830)
- The Stability of the Church of God, Independent of Political Changes (1833)
- The Salvation of Britain Introductory to the Conversion of the World (1835)
- The Evils of Improper Books (1838)
- The Prophecy of Daniel Regarding the Four Great Dynasties (1838)
- The Social Evils of Christendom are Not Sanctioned by the Bible (1839)
- National Warnings: A Sermon, Preached on Behalf of the Distressed Manufacturers (1842)
- The Three Conferences Held by the Opponents of the Maynooth College Endowment Bill in London and Dublin (1845)
- The Mountain-Monarchies Dissolved at the Presence of the Lord. A Lecture on the Recent Revolutions in Europe (1849)
- Nineveh, Its Rise and Ruin; as Illustrated by Ancient Scriptures and Modern Discoveries (1852)

In "Remarks on Ecclesiastical Architecture as applied to Nonconformist Chapels", published in The Congregational Year Book (1847), Blackburn was a proponent of the Gothic style, typically shunned at the time by nonconformists. He wrote the introduction to the Wycliffe Society's publication of the works of David Clarkson. He wrote an introduction and appendix to an edition (1838) of John M. Mason's The Claims of Episcopacy Refuted, replying to Bishop John Henry Hobart.
