= Henry Fleetwood =

Henry Fleetwood may refer to:

- Henry Fleetwood (Aylesbury MP) (born c 1565), MP for Aylesbury 1589, Wycombe 1601–11
- Henry Fleetwood (Preston MP) (c1667–1746), MP for Preston 1708–22

== See also ==
- Fleetwood (surname)
