= Thomas Fleetwood =

Thomas, Tom or Tommy Fleetwood may refer to:

- Thomas Fleetwood (of the Vache) (1518–1570), Master of the Mint, MP for Preston and Buckinghamshire
- Thomas Fleetwood (1661–1717), British landowner, and drainer of Martin Mere
- Sir Thomas Fleetwood, 2nd Baronet (1609–1670), of the Fleetwood baronets
- Sir Thomas Fleetwood, attorney general to Prince Henry, son of James I, of the Fleetwood baronets
- Tom Fleetwood (1888–1966), English footballer
- Tommy Fleetwood (born 1991), English golfer
