= Thomas Wilson (philanthropist) =

- Born: 11 November 1764
- Died: 17 June 1843 (aged 78)
- Occupation: Congregational benefactor
- Children: Joshua Wilson (1795–1874)

Thomas Wilson (11 November 1764 – 17 June 1843) was an English Congregational benefactor of chapels and educational institutions, and a founder member of the Council of University College London from 1825.

== Life ==
He was born in Cheapside, the son of Thomas Wilson (1731–1794), a ribbon manufacturer, and his wife Mary Remington, daughter of John Remington of Coventry. He was educated at Newington Green, at Cockburn's Academy. Wilson went into partnership with his father in 1785, having served as his apprentice.

In 1798 Wilson gave up the business. At the time he was living in Artillery Place, near Finsbury Square. In 1819 he lived in Maida Vale, and in 1823 in Highbury Place. From 1829 to 1842 he lived at 45 Burton Street, St Pancras. He was ultimately a man of considerable wealth, with Remington family money after the death in 1813 of an uncle on his mother's side.

Wilson was a lay preacher from 1804, and preached on a monthly basis at the London Female Penitentiary, a charity refuge. He was present at Peterloo in 1819 and supported parliamentary reform.

== Interests ==
Wilson promoted many causes, principally educational and theological. He was a director of the London Missionary Society; and in 1837 he became one of the founders of the Metropolitan Chapel Fund Association.

- From 1794, Wilson was treasurer of Hoxton Academy, where he took over from his father; and was also treasurer to its successor Highbury College, Middlesex.
- In 1825 he was a founder member of the Council of London University.

== Chapels ==
Wilson built, at his own expense, new Congregational chapels in London and elsewhere.

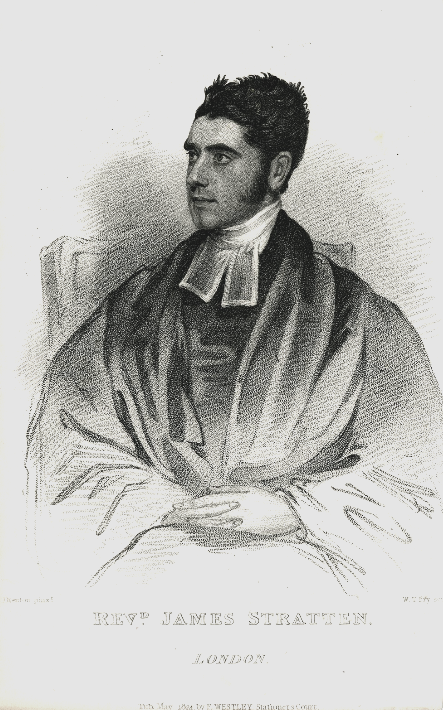
Rev. James Stratten, 1824 engraving

- 1813: Paddington Chapel. It was located between Homer Place (now Homer Street) and Harcourt Street, which runs between Upper York Street and the west end of Marylebone Road, then called New Road. Queen Charlotte’s Maternity Hospital moved the same year to an adjacent site, on the corner of New Road and Harcourt Road. "Standing back a little from the road, again on the south side, near Harcourt Street, is the Padddington Chapel, for Congregationalists." In the period 1816 to 1818, after the pastor Henry Townley left to travel to India for the London Missionary Society, Wilson had difficulty finding a permanent replacement for him. Samuel Dyer was ordained at the chapel in 1827, later in the year also sailing for India. The congregation included Elizabeth Barrett Browning, from 1836 to 1846, who appreciated the preaching of James Stratten. The chapel was demolished in 1981.

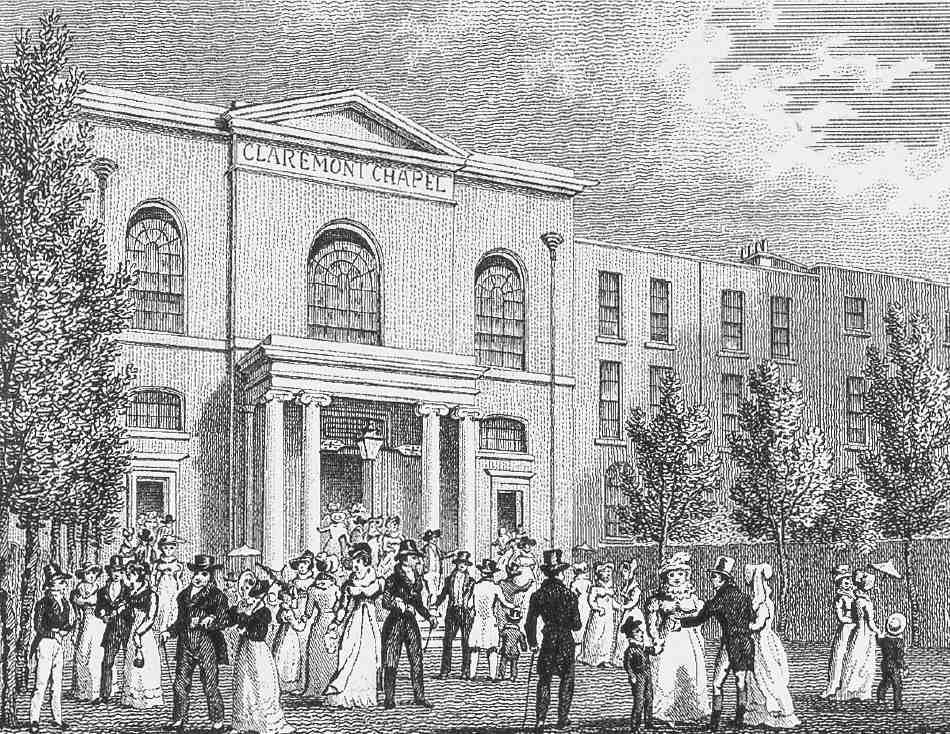
Claremont Chapel, around 1828

- 1819: Claremont Chapel on Pentonville Road. The chapel was used to 1899, after which it was known as Claremont Hall. It is unclear whom Wilson used as designer, one possibility being John Wallen, or his brother William. From 1822, John Blackburn was the permanent minister there.

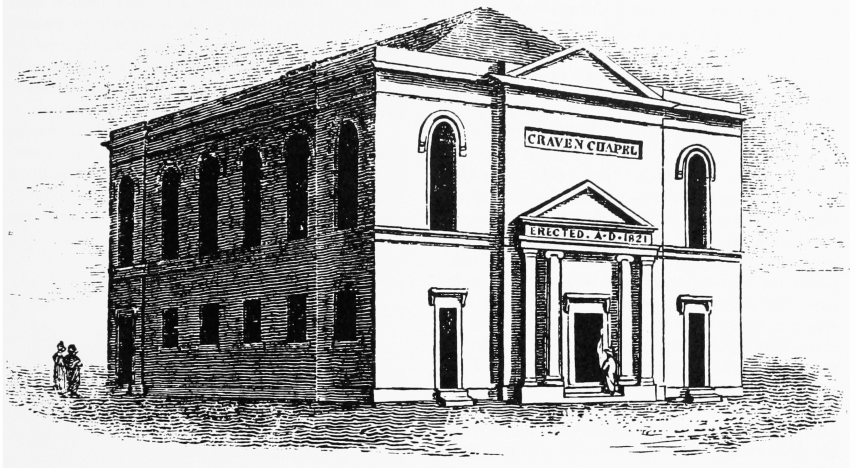
Craven Chapel

- 1822: Craven Chapel off Regent Street. It was built in 1821–2 to a design by Robert Abraham in Foubert's Place. The site, part of the former Carnaby Market, was sold to Wilson by William Craven, 1st Earl of Craven. A congregation formed in 1823, but there was no permanent minister until John Leifchild, who was there from 1831 to 1854. The chapel had basement schoolrooms.

== Works ==
- Select hymns. A supplement to Dr. Watts's Psalms and hymns (2nd edition 1808), as T. W.

== Family ==
Wilson married in 1791 Elizabeth Clegg, daughter of the Manchester timber merchant Arthur Clegg. Their children included the barrister Joshua Wilson (1795–1874). Joshua was his father's biographer, and was involved in forming the Congregational Union of England and Wales. Dr Williams's Library in London houses the Thomas and Joshua Wilson collection of papers.

- Rebekah (died 1870), eldest daughter, married in 1819 the Rev. James Stratten of the Paddington Chapel.
- Eliza (died 1878), married in 1823 at St Mary's Church, Islington the Rev. John Addison Coombs, who had been ordained minister at the Independent Chapel, Chapel Street, Salford in 1820.

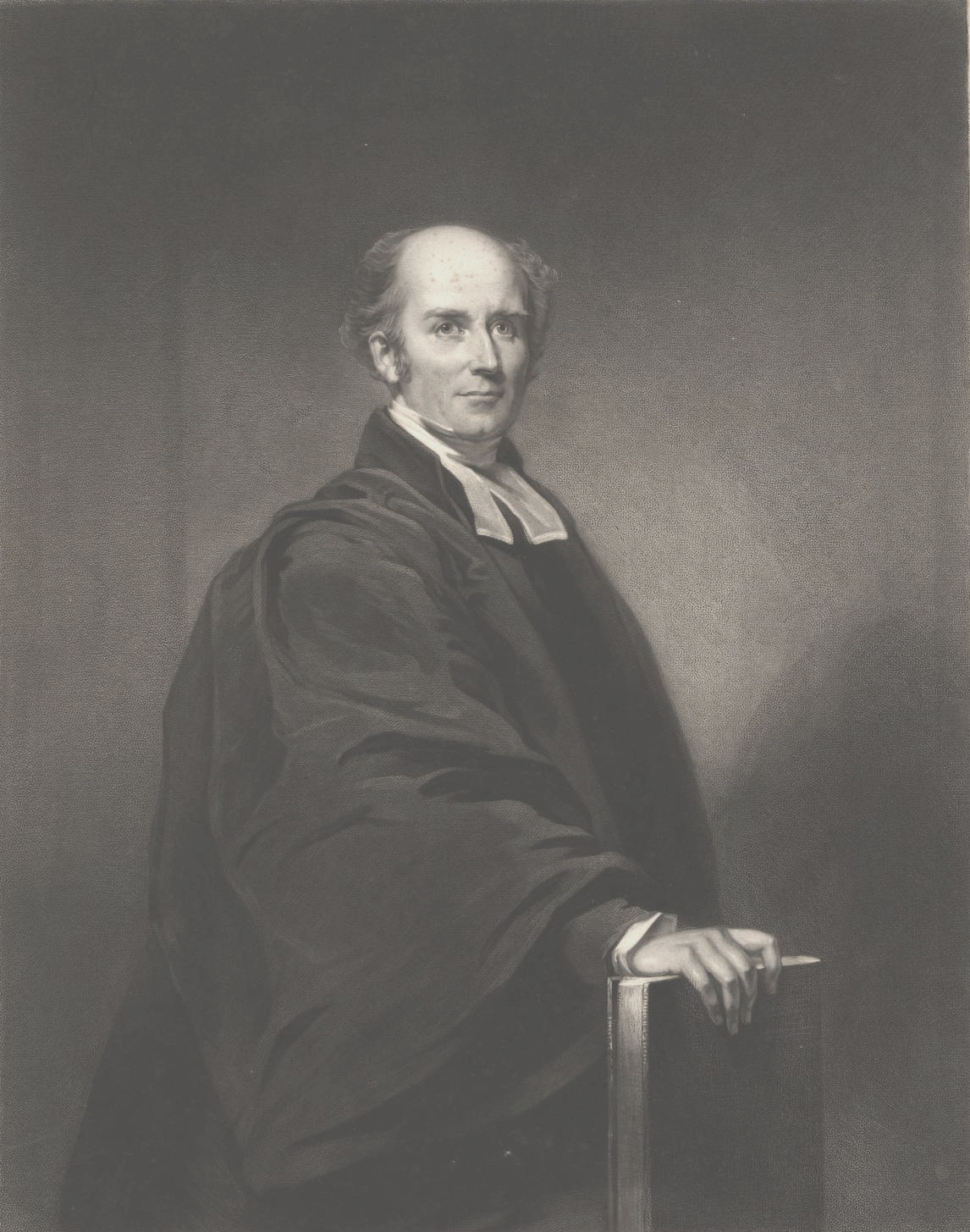
The Rev. John Addison Coombs, 1839 engraving

John Remington Mills was Wilson's nephew. He was the son of Samuel Mills of Russell Square and Mary Wilson, sister of Thomas Wilson.

== Legacy ==
A memorial to Wilson stands in Abney Park Cemetery in Stoke Newington, London. It is in the Yew Walk.
