= Hester Fleetwood =

Recipe book author

- Born: 1600s
- Died: 1714
- Spouse(s): George Fleetwood

Hester Fleetwood (? – 1714) was an English gentlewoman who compliled a book of recipes. She came to notice after her husband was tried for being a regicide having signed the document that authorised the execution of Charles I. Her husband was sentenced to death but after his appeals and Hester's intercession he was exiled. Hester was later befriended by Quakers. Her recipe book of foods and medicines which includes her shorthand notes is extant.

== Life ==
Fleetwood was the daughter of Judith and Sir Robert Smyth. Her father was a lawyer from the small village of Upton which is now part of London.

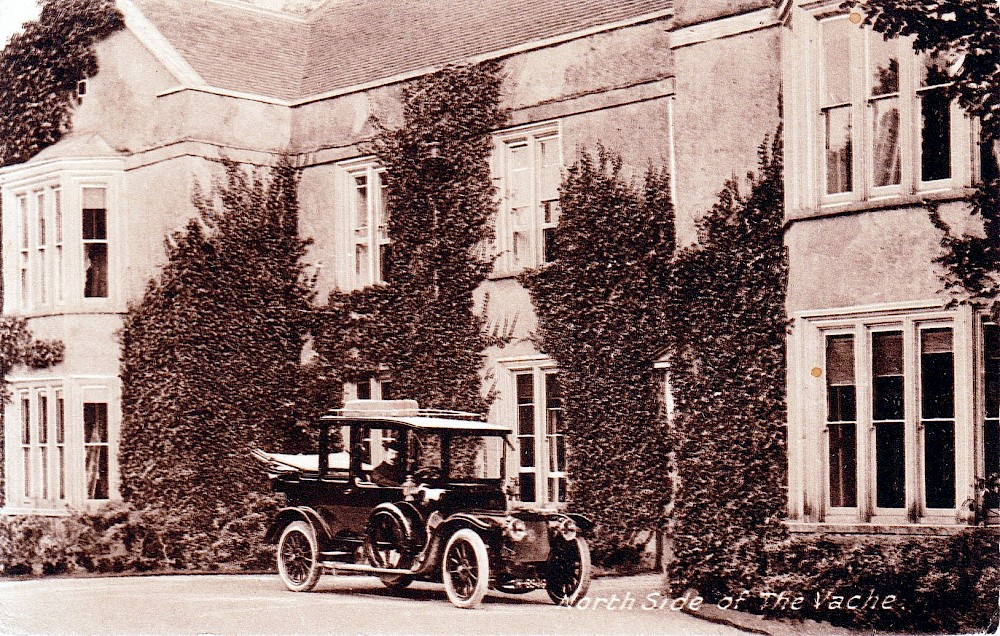
North Side of The Vache (in 1905)

She married George Fleetwood who was a young and leading parliamentarian. He had attended the trial of Charles the First and his signature appeared on his death warrant in 1649. Her marriage to George took place in 1651 or 1652. She was his second wife and he already had two children.

George was involved in the military and they lived at his family seat of The Vache which is a large country house (this is extant). His mother Anne lived with them. They had five more children although only Hester, Elizabeth and Robert survived. Her husband's career was going well and Oliver Cromwell made him a knight in 1656 during the commonwealth of England and a year later a Lord. Cromwell died and in 1660 the restoration of the monarchy was agreed. Hester made a note of Charles II's coronation in a book of recipes she was compiling for dishes and for medicines. She recorded, in shorthand. a discussion with Anne Fleetwood about religion.

Parliament passed an act giving a pardon to the crimes of the civil war but those who were involved with the regicide were not pardoned. 59 people had signed the document and several were tried, hanged, drawn and quartered but many were spared capital punishment. Her husband had been sentenced to death but he appealed claiming that he was young and Cromwell had bullied him to sign the death warrant and that he had been supportive of the recent restoration of the monarchy. In 1664 he was sentenced to be sent to Tangier. Hester interceded and it could be that as a result he went to America but his fate after 1664 is not known.

Her husband's assets were confiscated, including inheritance of The Vache. Since her dowager mother-in-law, Anne Fleetwood, had a life-interest in the manor and could continue to live there during her lifetime, Hester and her children could also live with her. Hester was said to have entertained leading non-conformists Samuel Cradock, Edward Terry and David Clarkson in 1665. Anne died on 29 May 1673 and Hester and her children were homeless and they went to live in the nearby village of Jordans. In 1678 she was attending a meeting of Quakers.

== Death and legacy ==
She died in 1714 and she requested to be buried in a Quaker burial ground, although this was ignored. Her recipe book is extant as it was passed down in the Russell family who had looked after her when she was evicted from The Vache. The recipe book shows that she could write shorthand and it includes how to get a worm out of a man's ear over several days and other cures that include dried bees and the use of snails applied to the eyes.
