= Threepwood =

Threepwood may refer to:

- Lands of Threepwood, an estate in North Ayrshire, Scotland
- The Threepwood family, P. G. Wodehouse characters from the Blandings Castle stories, including:
  - Lord Emsworth, Clarence Threepwood, head of the aristocratic Threepwood family
  - Freddie Threepwood, second son of Lord Emsworth
  - Galahad Threepwood, younger brother of Lord Emsworth
- Guybrush Threepwood, fictional character in the Monkey Island series of computer games

== See also ==
- Threapwood, a village in Cheshire
- Fleetwood (disambiguation)
