= Timothy Goodwin =

English-born Irish bishop

Timothy Goodwin, Godwin or Godwyn (1670?–1729) was an English churchman, who became archbishop of Cashel.

== Life ==
He was born at Norwich, probably about 1670. He began his education at the nonconformist academy of Samuel Cradock, at Geesings, Suffolk. Here he was a classmate in philosophy with Edmund Calamy, who entered in 1686 at the age of fifteen. Goodwin and Calamy were about the same age, and read Greek together in private. At this time he was intended for the medical profession; on leaving Geesings he went to London and lodged with Edward Hulse, M.D., in Aldermanbury. Turning his thoughts to divinity he entered St. Edmund's Hall, Oxford, where he graduated M.A. on 22 January 1697.

He was domestic chaplain to Charles Talbot, 1st Duke of Shrewsbury, who took him abroad and gave him the rectory of Heythorpe, Oxfordshire. On 1 August 1704, he was collated to the archdeaconry of Oxford. He accompanied Shrewsbury to Ireland in October 1713, on his appointment as Lord High Steward of Ireland. On 16 January 1714, he was made bishop of Kilmore and Ardagh. He rebuilt the episcopal residence at Kilmore, and made other improvements, two-thirds of his outlay being reimbursed by his successor, Josiah Hort, who also had begun life as a non-conformist. On 3 June 1727 Goodwin was translated to the archbishopric of Cashel, in succession to William Nicholson.

Godwin is specifically thanked by Bernard de Montfaucon in his preface to his edition of the works of John Chrysostom for his good offices in contacting John Potter, the future archbishop of Canterbury, for the establishment of certain texts of that author. He was less responsive to moves for a rapprochement with Gallican circles in France.

He died in Dublin on 13 December 1729. He published two separate sermons in 1716, and a third in 1724.

He married Anne Anderson, daughter and co-heiress of Charles Anderson of Worcester. Her sister Charlotte married Robert Jocelyn, 1st Viscount Jocelyn.
