= William Fleetwood (disambiguation) =

William Fleetwood (1656–1723) was Bishop of St Asaph and Bishop of Ely.

William Fleetwood may also refer to:

- William Fleetwood (judge) (c. 1535–1594), English barrister, politician, and judge
- William Fleetwood (died 1630) (1563–1630), English politician
- William Fleetwood (1603–1674), English courtier and politician

== See also ==
- William Fleetwood Sheppard (1863–1936), Australian-British civil servant, mathematician and statistician
