= Wallingford House =

Coordinates: 51.5058°N 0.1276°W

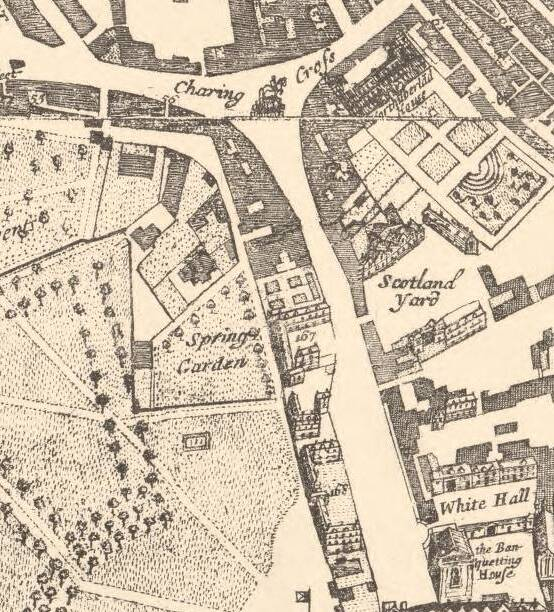
Wallingford House in Morgan's Map of the Whole of London in 1682, in centre of image, marked 167.

Wallingford House was a residence in London on the site now occupied by the Admiralty Buildings on Whitehall. Erected some time in the late 16th century, it would become associated with the Admiralty after George Villiers at the time Lord High Admiral, gained ownership in 1622.

== History ==
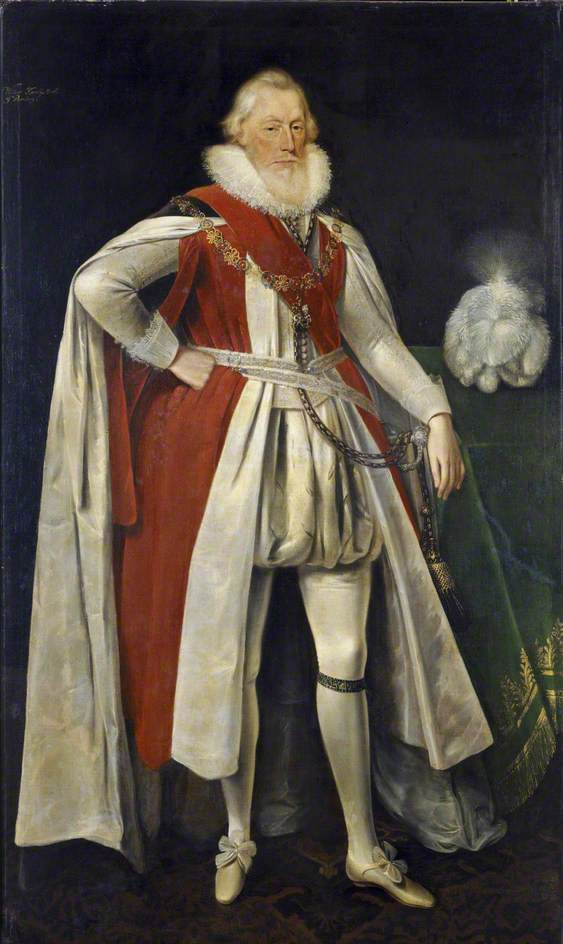
William Knollys, 1st Earl of Banbury who owned Wallingford House from 1596, it would be named after his title Viscount Wallingford.

=== Early development ===
The land of the site was leased to Thomas Brown in 1557 who surrendered much of it to the crown in 1560. In 1572 Sir Francis Knollys acquired the lease of the cottage that stood there as well as adjoining land and erected a large house on the site. His son William Knollys would take ownership of the house following his death in 1596, with the property being named after the title he later received of Viscount Wallingford.

=== Use by the Admiralty ===
In 1622, the house would come under the ownership of George Villiers, 1st Duke of Buckingham who was at the time Lord High Admiral which would lead to the house becoming associated with the affairs of the Admiralty.

=== Wallingford House Party ===
In the following decades the house's ownership would pass through various nobles. In the 1650s, the house would host the Wallingford House Party, led by its owner Charles Fleetwood, the party was at odds with Richard Cromwell who had been given the title of Lord Protector on the death of his father Oliver Cromwell who had favoured his son over Fleetwood.

=== Decline as a residence ===
After the restoration, the house would revert to the ownership of the Dukes of Buckingham. From the 1670s it would become increasingly used for official purposes rather than as a residence. The house was demolished in during the reign of William III in 1694 with a replacement serving as the first purpose built admiralty office. Christopher Wren was among those to suggest the use of the site for such a purpose. The present building was built a little later between 1724 and 1726.
