= Smith-Gordon baronets =

Baronetcy in the Baronetage of the United Kingdom

Escutcheon of the Smith-Gordon baronets

The Smith, later Smith-Gordon, baronetcy, is a title in the Baronetage of the United Kingdom. It was created on 19 July 1838 for General Lionel Smith, Governor of Jamaica from 1836 to 1839. The second Baronet assumed by royal licence the additional surname of Gordon in 1868 as his mother Isabella was the daughter of Eldred Curwen Pottinger and his wife Anne, daughter of Robert Gordon.

== Smith, later Smith-Gordon, baronets (1838) ==
- Sir Lionel Smith, GCB, GCH, 1st Baronet (1778–1842)
- Sir Lionel Eldred Smith-Gordon, 2nd Baronet (1833–1905)
- Sir Lionel Eldred Pottinger Smith-Gordon, 3rd Baronet (1857–1933)
- Sir Lionel Eldred Pottinger Smith-Gordon, 4th Baronet (1889–1976)
- Sir (Lionel) Eldred Peter Smith-Gordon, 5th Baronet (1935–2026)
- Sir Lionel George Eldred Smith-Gordon, 6th Baronet (born 1964)

The heir apparent is Lionel Henry Yuji Smith-Gordon (born 1998), eldest son of the 6th Baronet.

Baronetage of the United Kingdom
Preceded by Lytton baronets	Smith baronets 19 July 1838	Succeeded by Fleetwood baronets
