= George Fleetwood (regicide) =

English major-general and regicide

Fleetwood
- Country: England

George Fleetwood (1623–1672) was an English major-general and one of the regicides of King Charles I of England.

Fleetwood was one of the commissioners for the trial of Charles I, 1648–9; member of last Commonwealth Council of State and M.P. for Buckinghamshire, 1653; for Buckingham, 1654; member of Cromwell's Upper House, 1657; joined General George Monck, 1660, and though condemned to death at the Restoration, was never executed.

His abandoned second wife, Hester Fleetwood, went on to compile a book of recipes.

== Biography ==
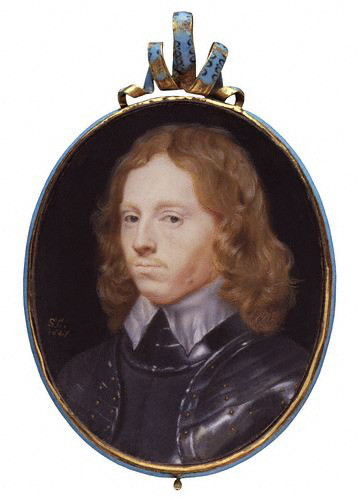
George Fleetwood

George Fleetwood was the grandson of Sir George Fleetwood (died December 1620), and the son of Charles Fleetwood (died 1628) and inherited the family estate of the Vache, near Chalfont St Giles in Buckinghamshire, on the death of his father. (Note: Some older sources such as Dictionary of National Biography (1889) "Fleetwood, George, Volume xix" pp. 265,266 state that George Fleetwood was the son of Sir Georg Fleetwood, knt., of the Vache, near Chalfont St. Giles, Buckinghamshire, and Catherine, daughter of Henry Benny of Waltham, Essex; and that in the will of Sir George Fleetwood, who died December 1620, George Fleetwood is described as his third son, but Edward and Charles, his elder brothers, appear to have died without issue. While John Bernard Burke publishing in the 1830s lists George Fleetwood (regicide) as a brother of Charles Fleetwood (parliamentary general), and George Fleetwood (Swedish general) as their uncle, brother of Sir William who is listed as their father (John Burke, A Genealogical and Heraldic History of the Commoners of Great Britain and Ireland Enjoying Territorial Possessions Or High Official Rank: But Uninvested with Heritable Honours, Volume 4, Colburn, 1838. p. 522)—This is unlikely as Burk's family tree does not explain how George the regicide came to inherit (and lose) the Vache when there were others closer in line to inherit the estate, but several other old sources also include this relationship, for example Mark Noble (1798) in The Lives of the English Regicides: And Other Commissioners of the Pretended High Court of Justice, Appointed to Sit in Judgement Upon Their Sovereign, King Charles the First, Volume I, p. 243.)

In Mercurius Aulicus, 7 December 1643, it is stated that "Young Fleetwood of The Vache" had raised a troop of dragoons for the parliament, to defend the Chiltern parts of Buckinghamshire; and in an ordinance of 27 June 1644 the name of Fleetwood appears in the list of the Buckinghamshire committee.

Fleetwood entered the Long Parliament in July 1647 as member for Buckinghamshire. In 1648 he was appointed one of the commissioners for the trial of the king, attended two sittings of the court, and was present also when sentence was pronounced, and signed the death-warrant.

In 1649 and 1650 Fleetwood was Colonel of the Buckinghamshire Militia, and was chosen a member of the eighth and last council of state of the Commonwealth from 1 November to 10 December 1653. He was a widower with two children when he married Hester Fleetwood (born Smyth) in 1651 or 1652. At least two of their five children died young leaving two daughters and a son named Robert.

He represented the county of Buckingham in the assembly of 1653, and the town in the parliament of 1654 Cromwell knighted him in the autumn of 1656, and summoned him to Cromwell's Upper House in December 1657.

On the occasion of Sir George Booth's rising parliament authorised Fleetwood to raise a "troop of well-affected volunteers". He refused to assist John Lambert against George Monck, opposed the oath of abjuration in parliament, was entrusted with the command of a regiment by Monck in the spring of 1660, and proclaimed Charles II at York on 11 May 1660.

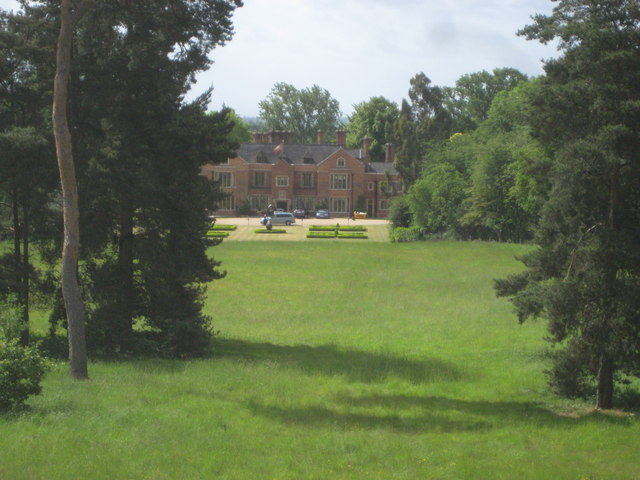
The Vache, Buckinghamshire

When the regicides were summoned to surrender he gave himself up on 16 June 1660, but was excepted from the Act of Indemnity. At his trial (October 1660) Fleetwood pleaded guilty, was sentenced to death, and said, weeping, that he had confessed the fact, and wished he could express his sorrow.

A saving clause in the Act of Indemnity suspended the execution of those who claimed the benefit of the king's proclamation, unless their conviction was followed by a special act of parliament for their execution. Fleetwood accordingly petitioned parliament, stating that his name was inserted in the list of commissioners without his knowledge and against his will, and that his signature to the warrant was extorted by Cromwell, "whose power, commands, and threats (he being then young) frighted him into court". He produced certificates from Monck and Ashley of his services in forwarding the Restoration, enlarged on his early and continued repentance, and begged "to be represented to his majesty as a fit object of his royal clemency and mercy to hold his life merely by his princely grace". His life was spared, but his estate of The Vache confiscated and given to the Duke of York.

Sources are unclear what happened to Fleetwood from 1664. In 1664 a warrant was issued for Fleetwood's transportation to Tangiers, but it may have been suspended at the solicitation of his wife. According to Noble he was finally released and went to America. However, it seems clear from his death notice in the London Gazette of 9–13 January 1672 that he in fact died in Tangiers on 17 November 1672 [17].

== Notes ==
Footnotes

Citations

- The London Gazette, Published by Authority. Number 746, from Thursday 9 January to Sunday 13 January 1672.
