= Militia Ordinance =

17th Century English legislation

- Parliament of England
- Long title: An Ordinance of the Lords and Commons in Parliament for the safety and defence of the Kingdom of England and Dominion of Wales
- Citation: [L.J., iv., 625.]
- Introduced by: Sir Arthur Haselrige
- Territorial extent: Kingdom of England

Dates
- Royal assent: Withheld
- Commencement: 15 March 1642

Status: Revoked

The Militia Ordinance was passed by the Parliament of England on 15 March 1642. By claiming the right to appoint military commanders without the king's approval, it was a significant step in events leading to the outbreak of the First English Civil War in August.

The 1641 Irish Rebellion meant there was widespread support in England for raising military forces to suppress it. However, as relations between Charles I and Parliament deteriorated, neither side trusted the other, fearing such an army might be used against them.

The only permanent military force available were the trained bands, or county militia, controlled by lord lieutenants, who in turn were appointed by the king. In December 1641, Sir Arthur Haselrige introduced a militia bill giving Parliament the right to nominate its commanders, not Charles, which was passed by the House of Commons.

After failing to arrest the Five Members on 5 January, 1642, Charles left London, and headed north to York; over the next few weeks, many Royalist members of the Commons and House of Lords joined him. The result was a Parliamentary majority in the Lords, who approved the bill on 5 March 1642, while confirming doing so was not a violation of the Oath of Allegiance.

The bill was returned to the Commons for approval the same day, then passed to Charles for his royal assent, required for it to become a legally binding act of Parliament. When he refused, Parliament declared on 15 March 1642 "the People are bound by the Ordinance for the Militia, though it has not received the Royal Assent".

Charles responded to this unprecedented assertion of parliamentary sovereignty by issuing Commissions of Array, although these were statements of intent, with little practical impact on the raising of armies. Parliament continued to pass and enforce ordinances throughout the 1640s, most of which were declared void after the 1660 Restoration; an exception was the 1643 excise duty.

== Sources ==
- Firth, C. H.; Rait, R. S., eds. (1911). Acts & Ordinances of the Interregnum 1642-1660; Volume I. HMSO.
- Hibbert, Christopher (1993). Cavaliers and Roundheads: The English at War 1642-1649. HarperCollins. ISBN 978-0246136329.
- Hutton, Ronald (2003). The Royalist War Effort 1642-1646. Routledge. ISBN 9780415305402.
- Journal of the House of Lords; Volume 4 5 March 1642. HMSO. 1767–1830.
- Wheeler, J. S. (1999). The Making of a World Power: War and the Military Revolution in Seventeenth Century England. Stroud: Sutton. ISBN 0-7509-2025-4.
- "5 March 1642: Ordinance of Parliament for the Safety and Defence of the Kingdom". House of Lords Journal, 1629–42. London: His Majesty's Stationery Office. 1830. pp. 624–625 – via British History Online.
- "15 March 1642: That the People are bound by the Ordinance for the Militia, though it has not received the Royal Assent". House of Lords Journal, 1629–42. London: His Majesty's Stationery Office. 1830. pp. 645–646 – via British History Online.
