= John Fleetwood =

John Fleetwood may refer to:

- John Fleetwood (died 1590), MP for Staffordshire
- John Fleetwood (MP) (1686–1745), MP for Buckinghamshire 1713–1722
- Sir John Fleetwood, 5th Baronet (died 1741), of the Fleetwood baronets
