= George Fleetwood (priest) =

George Fleetwood was the Archdeacon of Totnes in 1713.

He married Dorothy, daughter of Sir George Farewell.
