= Wallingford House party =

The Wallingford House party was a group of senior officers (Grandees) of the English New Model Army who met at Wallingford House, the London home of Charles Fleetwood. (Note: Cokayne notes that Wallingford House stood at the end of the tilt-yard in Whitehall, on the site of the present Admiralty. It was so called after Sir William Knollys, Treasurer of the Household, who was created Viscount Wallingford in 1616.) Their intention was to overthrow the Protectorate of the Lord Protector, Richard Cromwell.

On 23 April 1659 the party ended the Third Protectorate Parliament by locking the doors of the assembly rooms. On 6 May the Council of Officers meeting in Wallingford House, invited the Rump Parliament to reassemble, which it did the following day, appointing a Committee of Safety to form the executive until a new Council of State was appointed on 19 May.
