= Hesketh-Fleetwood baronets of Rossall Hall (1838) =

Escutcheon of the Hesketh-Fleetwood baronets of Rossall Hall

The Hesketh-Fleetwood baronetcy, of Rossall Hall in the County of Lancaster, was created in the Baronetage of the United Kingdom in July 1838 for Peter Hesketh-Fleetwood, a politician and landowner. He was a descendant of the youngest son of William Fleetwood of Hesketh through the female line, a grandson of Margaret Fleetwood, heiress of Rossall who married Roger Hesketh in 1733. He assumed the additional surname of Fleetwood in 1831. He gave the name to the town of Fleetwood which he developed.

The title became extinct on the death of his son, the 2nd Baronet, in 1881.

== Hesketh-Fleetwood baronets, of Rossall Hall (1838) ==
- Sir Peter Hesketh-Fleetwood, 1st Baronet (1801–1866)
- Sir Peter Louis Hesketh-Fleetwood, 2nd Baronet (1838–1881)

== Notes ==
Baronetage of the United Kingdom
Preceded by Smith baronets	Hesketh-Fleetwood baronets of Rossall Hall; July 1838	Succeeded by Crompton baronets
