= The Vache =

Estate in Buckinghamshire, England

Coordinates: 51.6401°N 0.5618°W

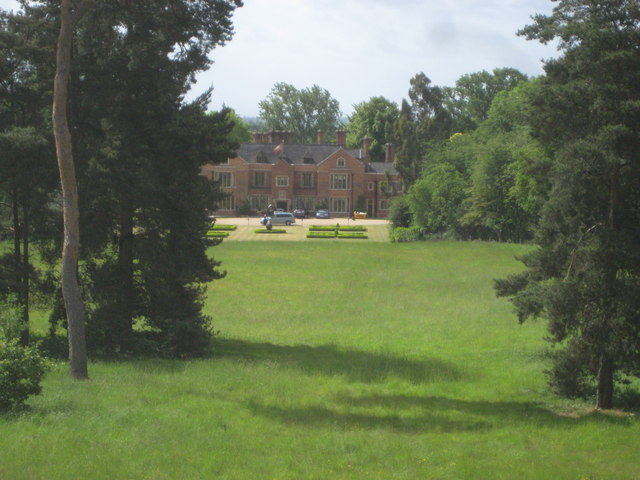
The Vache

The Vache is an estate near Chalfont St Giles in Buckinghamshire, England. Within the estate is a monument dedicated to the memory of Captain James Cook (1728–1779), the explorer. It has been owned or occupied by, among others, Hester and George Fleetwood, regicide of Charles I.

== History ==
The Vache was the family seat of the Fleetwoods. Thomas Fleetwood, the younger son of a provincial family, made his fortune by serving in the London Mints (as comptroller, assayer, commissioner for new coinage, under treasurer, etc.) He was granted the family's arms on 4 July 1548 The profits from the appointments enabled him to buy the Vache in 1564. He was a Member (MP) of the Parliament of England for Buckinghamshire in 1563 and was pricked High Sheriff of Bedfordshire and Buckinghamshire for 1564–65. The Vache estate passed to the second of his sons, George Fleetwood (1564-1620), also an MP.

The estate descended via George's son Charles (died 1628) to another George Fleetwood (1623–1672), a major-general and one of the regicides of King Charles. (Note: Some older sources such as Dictionary of National Biography (1889) "Fleetwood, George, Volume xix" pp. 265,266 state that George Fleetwood was the son of Sir Georg Fleetwood, knt., of the Vache, near Chalfont St. Giles, Buckinghamshire, and Catherine, daughter of Henry Benny of Waltham, Essex; and that in the will of Sir George Fleetwood, who died December 1620, George Fleetwood is described as his third son, but Edward and Charles, his elder brothers, appear to have died without issue. While John Bernard Burke publishing in the 1830s lists George Fleetwood (regicide) as a brother of Charles Fleetwood (parliamentary general), and George Fleetwood (Swedish general) as their uncle, brother of Sir William who is listed as their father (John Burke, A Genealogical and Heraldic History of the Commoners of Great Britain and Ireland Enjoying Territorial Possessions Or High Official Rank: But Uninvested with Heritable Honours, Volume 4, Colburn, 1838. p. 522)—This is unlikely as Burk's family tree does not explain how George the regicide came to inherit (and lose) the Vache when there were others closer in line to inherit the estate, but several other old sources also include this relationship, for example Mark Noble (1798) in The Lives of the English Regicides: And Other Commissioners of the Pretended High Court of Justice, Appointed to Sit in Judgement Upon Their Sovereign, King Charles the First, Volume I, p. 243.) In 1660 George Fleetwood was found guilty of killing the king, and although his life was spared, his estate of The Vache was confiscated and given to the then Duke of York, the future King James II. His wife, Hester Fleetwood and their children would have been homeless, but they were allowed to remain until George's mother, Anne Fleetwood, died in 1673.

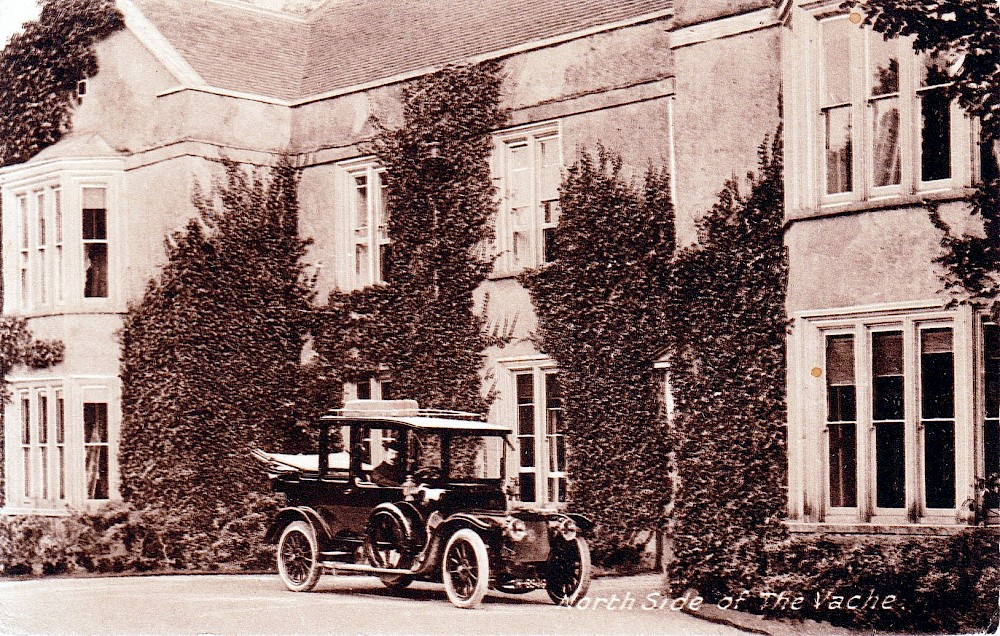
North Side of The Vache in 1905

The Vache (then spelled Vatche) was part of the dowry of Mary Margaret Alston, who married Rev Dr Francis Hare at St Paul's Cathedral in 1728. The couple lived there, bringing up their seven children while the bishop wrote the books that made his name. He died in 1740 and was buried in a mausoleum in the local church. Their eldest son, Robert (named after Robert Walpole), had the Vache settled on him when he came of age; it is mentioned in his 1752 marriage settlement with Sarah Selman. He became a Prebendary Canon of Winchester Cathedral, and, as he also owned Herstmonceux Castle, nearer to the city, he decided to sell the Vache in the 1770s. The estate was acquired by Admiral Sir Hugh Palliser. Following Palliser's death in 1796, the building passed to his son and was then sold to Thomas Allen in 1826; the house passed down the Allen family until it was sold to James Robertson in 1902.

After the Second World War, homelessness and overcrowding sparked a nationwide movement of squatting. One of the first of these occurred at The Vache in September 1946. The leader was an ex-Commando, John Mann, of Chalfont St. Giles, who had been sharing a small cottage with his wife, his five-year-old son, and ten strangers. At the local pub one night, Mann heard a Polish captain say that a deserted army camp at nearby Vache Park was being readied for Polish soldiers of General Władysław Anders's army in exile. Mann decided to get there first. At dawn, he and a handful of homeless veterans bloodlessly routed three Polish guards and seized Vache Park. Next day, 120 families had moved into the spacious army huts. After a flurry of resistance, local authorities capitulated.

== Captain James Cook monument ==
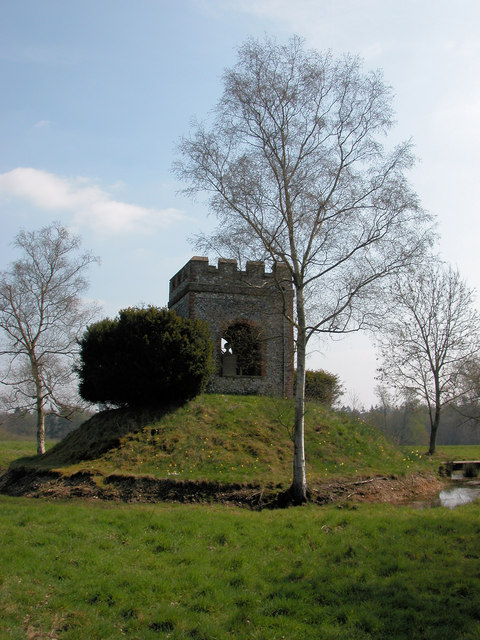
Captain James Cook monument

The Vache is the site of a monument to Captain James Cook, erected by Admiral Sir Hugh Palliser. The inscription reads, in part:

To the memory of Captain James Cook

The ablest and most renowned Navigator this or any country hath produced. He raised himself solely by his merit from a very obscure birth to the rank of Post Captain in the royal navy ...

He possessed in an eminent degree all the qualifications requisite for his profession and great undertakings together with the amiable and worthy qualities of the best men. Cool and deliberate in judging, sagacious in determining, active in executing, steady and persevering in enterprising from vigilance and unremitting caution, unsubdued by labour, difficulties, and disappointments, fertile in expedience never wanting presence of mind: always possessing himself and the full use of a sound understanding. Mild, just, but exact in discipline he was a father to his people who were attached to him from affection and obedient from confidence. He explored the Southern Hemisphere to a much higher latitude than had ever been reached, and with fewer accidents than frequently befall those who navigate the coasts of this island. By his benevolent and unabating attention to the welfare of his ship's company, he discovered and introduced a system for the preservation of the health of seamen in long voyages, ...

Traveller! Contemplate, admire, revere, and emulate this great master in his profession, whose skill and labours have enlarged natural philosophy have extended nautical science and have disclosed the long. concealed and admirable arrangements of the Almighty in the formation of this globe, and at the same time the arrogance of mortals, in presuming to account by their speculations for the laws by which he was pleased to create it. ...

If the arduous but exact researches of this extraordinary man have not discovered a new world they have discovered seas unnavigated and unknown before. They have made us acquainted with islands, people and productions of which we had no conception. ... If public services merit public acknowledgements, if the man who adorned and raised the fame of his country is deserving of honours, then Captain COOK deserves to have a monument raised to his memory by a generous and grateful nation.
