= Francis Fleetwood =

American architect

Francis Freile Fleetwood
- Born: June 17, 1946; Santiago, Chile
- Died: May 8, 2015 (aged 68); Wellington, Florida, U.S.
- Education: Dalton School; Fessenden School; Riverdale Country School; Bard College; Massachusetts Institute of Technology
- Occupation: Architect
- Spouse: Stephanie Turner
- Children: 1 daughter, Catherine Newsome, 1 stepson, Michael Orhan
- Parent(s): Harvey Fleetwood; Maria Freile
- Relatives: 1 brother, Blake Fleetwood, 2 sisters, Carmen Paul and Charlotte Fleetwood

Francis Fleetwood (1946-2015) was an American architect. He designed over 200 mansions in The Hamptons, mainly in the shingle style.

== Early life ==
Francis Fleetwood was born on June 17, 1946, in Santiago, Chile. His father, Harvey Fleetwood, was a banker. His mother, Maria Freile, was a psychoanalyst. He had a brother, Blake, and two sisters, Carmen and Charlotte. The family moved to the United States in 1948, settling in New York.

Fleetwood was educated at the Dalton School, the Fessenden School and the Riverdale Country School. He graduated from Bard College with a Bachelor of Arts degree in 1970, and earned a master's degree in architecture from the Massachusetts Institute of Technology (MIT) in 1973.

== Career ==
Fleetwood started his career by working for Pielstick & Roselack, an architectural firm based in Aspen, Colorado. From 1977 to 1979, he worked for Philip Johnson in New York.

Fleetwood founded Francis Fleetwood and Associates, an architectural firm, in 1980. He designed over 200 mansions in The Hamptons, mainly in the shingle style. Notable customers included Nicole Miller, Neil Hirsch, Gerald Clarke, Alec Baldwin, as well as Lauren Bacall, Calvin Klein, Paul McCartney, and George Stephanopoulos. By 2001, a mansion he designed for commodities trader David Campbell on Georgica Pond was listed as one of the most expensive properties in the United States, at $50 million; it sold for $45 million in 2004. While most of his work was in The Hamptons, he also designed properties in Florida and Connecticut.

Fleetwood was a member of the American Institute of Architects (AIA).

== Personal life and death ==
Fleetwood married Stephanie Turner. He had a daughter, Catherine Newsome, and a stepson, Michael Orhan. He resided in Amagansett, New York, where he was a member of the Devon Yacht Club, and Wellington, Florida, where he died on May 8, 2015.
