= William Fleetwood (1603–1674) =

English MP (c. 1603–1674)

Sir William Fleetwood (c 1603 – 12 February 1674) of High Lodge, Woodstock Park, Oxfordshire was an English courtier and politician who sat in the House of Commons in 1640 and again from 1661 to 1674.

Fleetwood was the eldest surviving son of Sir Miles Fleetwood of Aldwinkle, Northamptonshire, and of Anne, daughter of Nicholas Luke of Woodend, Bedfordshire and was baptised at Cardington, Bedfordshire on 20 July 1603. He was admitted at Emmanuel College, Cambridge on 3 December 1618. He was comptroller of Woodstock Park, Oxfordshire and cupbearer to King James I and King Charles I and was knighted on 20 July 1624. In 1633 he was incorporated at Oxford as M.A. of Cambridge.

In April 1640, Fleetwood was elected Member of Parliament for Woodstock in the Short Parliament. He acquired in 1641 the lucrative post of Receiver-General of the Court of Wards, only to be deprived of it by Parliament in 1643 in favour of his Parliamentarian brother Charles. In 1661 he was re-elected MP for Woodstock for the Cavalier Parliament and sat until his death in 1674.

Fleetwood died at the age of 71. He had married twice; firstly before 1631, Frances, the daughter and heiress of Henry Sture of Maridge, Devon, with whom he had 3 sons and a daughter and secondly c.1638, Elizabeth, the daughter and heiress of Thomas Harvey of Twycross, Leicestershire, with whom he had a further 4 sons and 3 daughters.

Fleetwood was the brother of Sir George Fleetwood, a baron of Sweden, and of Charles Fleetwood, the parliamentary general.

Parliament of England
Parliament suspended since 1629	Member of Parliament for Woodstock; 1640; With: William Lenthall	Succeeded by William Lenthall; William Herbert
