= Fleetwood (baronial family) =

- Landed gentry Swedish nobility 49th Baronial Family
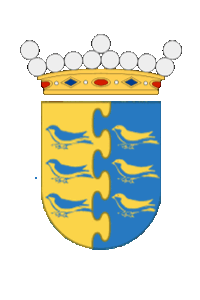
- Arms: Party per pale nebuly azure and or, six martlets, 2, 2 and 2 counterchanged Crest: A wolf trippant, regardant or, wounded in the shoulder, proper
- Founded: 1320; 706 years ago
- Founder: William Fleetwood
- Titles: Baronets of Caldwick (1611); Friherrliga ätten Fleetwood (1654); Baronets of Rossall Hall (1838)
- Estates: Former: Calwich Abbey; The Vache; Missenden Abbey; Wootton Lodge; Rossall Hall
- Website: Riddarhuset

Fleetwood is an Anglo-Swedish baronial family. The lineage was introduced with number 49 in the House of Nobility, also known as the Riddarhuset.

== English origins ==
=== Descent and claims ===
The House was founded in the 14th century by William Fleetwood from whom all members descend. In 1320, he married Gwlladis, only daughter and heir to Meredith, son of Canuan, son of Conan, son of Owain Gwynedd. The later, was a king of Gwynedd who reigned in 1137 to his death in November 1169 and was married to Gwladys ap Llywarch, a daughter and heir of L'Loworth.

=== Rise to wealth ===
As such, the English family originates in Heskin, Lancashire, but it was of little importance until the 16th century, when Thomas Fleetwood and his three brothers moved south. The eldest, John Fleetwood, a clerk of Chancery by 1535, acquired a large estate mainly in Staffordshire and Lancashire, in each of which counties he was twice high sheriff; of the two other brothers, the elder, Edmund Fleetwood, entered the Charterhouse at Sheen and the younger, Robert Fleetwood, became a Clerk of the Petty Bag and was father of William Fleetwood, Recorder of London.

=== Family lines ===
A genealogy chart perused by William Segar, Garter Principal King of Arms, on 19 June 1632, is kept in deposit by the Nordic Museum. It depicts lineal descents and portrays the achievement of Sir George Fleetwood, Edward Fleetwood of Penwortham and Sir William Fleetwood of Misseden.

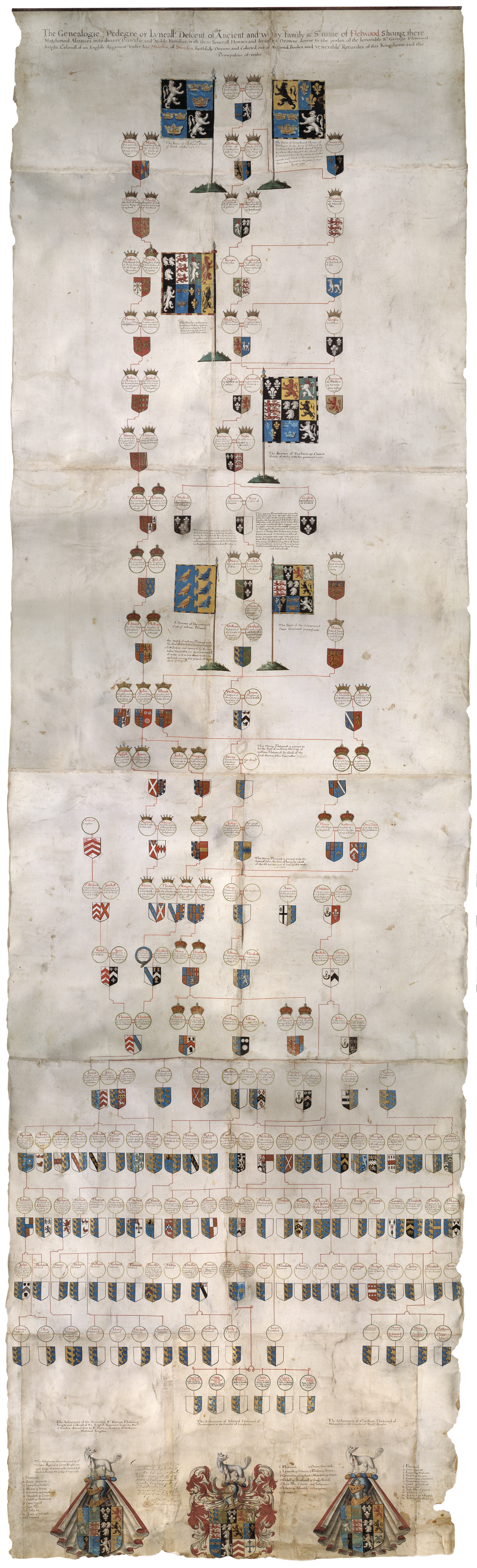
Genealogy chart held at the Nordic Museum

An excerpt below starting with Edward Fleetwood:

- Edward Fleetwood (1466 – ?) married Elisabeth (1468 – ?), daughter to Roger of Holland of Up Holland (1418–1494)
  - William Fleetwood of Hesketh married Ellenor, daughter to Robert Standish
    - John Fleetwood (1516–1591) married Joane (1528–1607), daughter to Thomas Langton, Baron of Walton and Lord of Newton (1497—1569)
      - Richard Fleetwood of Penwortham, married Margery, daughter to Sir Thomas Leigh of Eginton
        - Edward Fleetwood of Penwortham, married Margery, eldest daughter to William Norreys; had issue
        - Richard Fleetwood, married to Elisabeth, daughter to Edmund Trafford; had issue
      - Sir Thomas Fleetwood, Attorney General to Henry Frederick, Prince of Wales, son of James I, and Clerk of the Petty Bag; married the daughter of Richard Sherborn
        - William Fleetwood, Cup Bearer to James I and Charles I; married Dorothye, daughter to Sir William Cockayne; had issue
        - Sir Richard Fleetwood, 1st Baronet of Caldwick, married Anne, daughter to Sir John Penhall; had issue
    - Thomas Fleetwood of the Vache in Chalfont (1518–1570), married Barbara Andrews (1525 – ?); later married Bridget, daughter to Robert Spring
      - Edvard Fleetwood of Rossall Hall, married Christina, daughter to Paul Wentworth; had issue
      - Sir William Fleetwood of Cranford, married Jane, daughter to Sir Gervase Clifton, 1st Bt of the Manor of Clifton
        - Sir Miles Fleetwood of Aldwinkle, married Anne, daughter to Sir Nicholas Luke
          - Sir William Fleetwood of High Lodge, Woodstock Park, married Francis, daughter to Henry Steere, Esq.; had issue
          - Charles Fleetwood (c. 1618–1692), was a Parliamentary soldier and politician, Lord Deputy of Ireland; married Bridget, daughter to Oliver Cromwell, Lord Protector of the Commonwealth of England, Scotland and Ireland
          - Sir George Fleetwood; introduced in Sweden's Riddarhuset as a baron; married Brigitta Gÿllenstierna; had issue
      - Sir George Fleetwood of the Vache, married Katherine, sister to the Earl of Norwich; had issue
      - Lord Bishop James Fleetwood
    - Robert Fleetwood, Clerk of the Petty Bag
      - William Fleetwood, Recorder of London
        - Sir William Fleetwood of Misseden, married Anne, daughter to Robert Barton of Smithills Hall
          - Lord Bishop William Fleetwood

== Swedish nobility ==
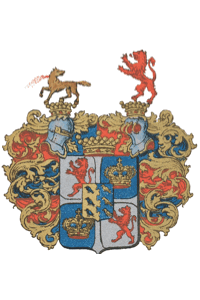
Baronial family arms

=== House of Nobility ===
Sir George was knighted 3 June 1632 by the Swedish King Gustav II Adolf; created a Swedish baron 1 June 1654 at Uppsala Castle by Queen Christina, and was introduced into the House of Nobility on 19 June 1654 as Baronial family No 49 with the following blazon:

[..] Quarterly with an inescutcheon with the former Fleetwood weapon; in the uppermost quarter on the left and lowest on right an upright standing lion of red color in a field argent; In the upper one on the right and the last Shield on the left a crown in gold in field azure. [..]

Descendants of George Fleetwood, the Swedish general and baron, include the former member of the Swedish Parliament Elisabeth Fleetwood and painter William Fleetwood.

== See also ==
- Fleetwood baronets
- Fleetwood coastal town
- HMS Fleetwood
