= George Fleetwood (Swedish general) =

Englishman who became a Swedish general and noble

Friherre / Baron George Fleetwood
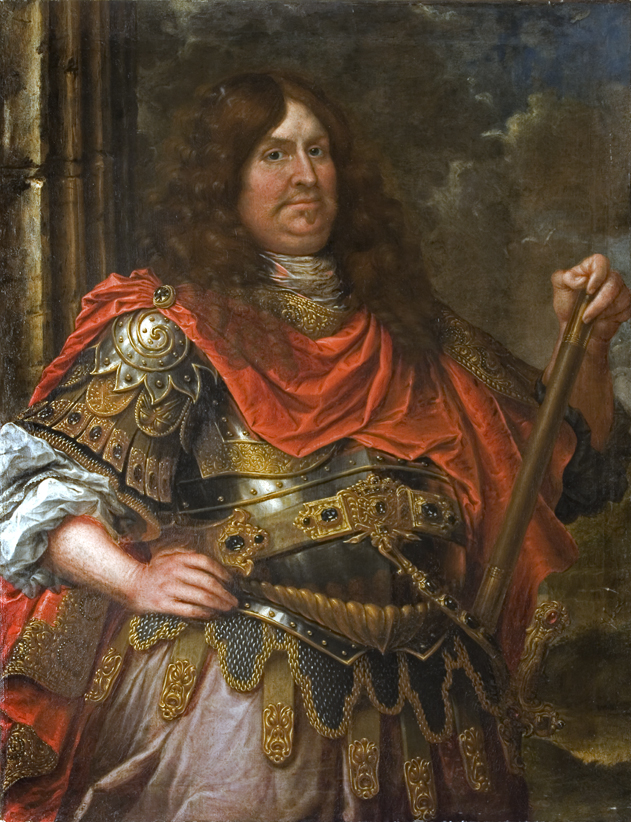
- Born: 30 June 1605; Cople, Bedfordshire
- Died: 11 June 1667 (aged 61); Jälunda, Gryt, Södermanland, Sweden
- Burial place: Allhelgona church in Nyköping
- Spouse: Brita Gyllenstierna
- Relatives: Miles Fleetwood (father); William Fleetwood (brother); Charles Fleetwood (brother)
- Military career
- Allegiance: (yes) Swedish Empire
- Branch: Swedish Army
- Service years: 1629–1667
- Rank: Lieutenant-general; Military councillor (Krigsråd)
- Commands: See Service record section
- Conflicts: Thirty Years' War; Torstenson War; Second Northern War

Sir George Fleetwood (1605–1667) was an Englishman who became a Swedish general and baron.

He founded a cadet branch of the Fleetwood family in Sweden, with issue until the present time.

== English origins ==
He was second son of Sir Miles Fleetwood of Cranford and Aldwinkle, Northamptonshire, receiver of the court of wards, and brother of Charles Fleetwood, the parliamentary general. George was baptised at Cople, Bedfordshire, 30 June 1605.

At the age of 16, George matriculated at the University of Oxford (9 November 1621). He gained a Bachelor of Arts on 6 February 1624.

== In the Swedish Army ==
In 1629 George raised a troop of horse for Swedish service in Germany during the Thirty Years' War and became a major in Colonel James Spens' regiment. After promotion to lieutenant-colonel he returned to England, by March, and having collected a regiment of foot, he obtained Chancellor Axel Oxenstierna's support to return to Sweden to meet King Gustav II Adolf personally regarding military matters. He recruited a regiment of infantry (a mostly English regiment with some Scots) in 1630.

Oxenstierna remarked that Fleetwood was a good man and that he would have had less trouble with Spens' old regiment if it had gone to Fleetwood rather than the Earl of Crawford, and in April 1631 he recommended Fleetwood to Gustav II Adolf with regard to recruitment. He was knighted by king Gustav II Adolf in Germany on 3 June 1632, and he was present at the battle of Lützen in November at which the king was killed. It is said that after the fall of Gustav II Adolf he held back retreating Swedish troops together with the King's court and army-chaplain, superintendent Dr. Jacob Fabritius.

His account of King Gustav II Adolf's death:

The King at the first charging to the graft, was shott through the arme and his horses neck; upon which they would fayne have perswaded him to have retyred, which he refused, rideing to the heade of the right winge of horse, incourageing them, saying nothing ailed him, and with that, comandeing them all to follow him, he leaped over the graft and charged the enimie; but there followed him but fower regiments, which weare encountred with soe many of the enimie that they wre forced to retyre. And there the Kinge fell, being shott through the heade and through the bodye. There fell iust by him one Truckes his chamber younker, whoe was brought off alyve, but since deade: he reported that when our horse retyred there came an officer of the enimies, whoe asked him whoe the Kinge was, which he refused to tell; he shott him through the bodye, and with that went to the Kinge demanding of himself what he was, to which he replyed he was the Kinge of Swethen; upon which he thought to have carryed off the bodye, but seeing our horse comeing againe to charge, he stroak the Kinge through the body with a broade sworde twyce, and then runn away, for then Herticke Bernard himself charged with the horse, beat the enimie back and brought the corps off, which had receaved in all tenn woundes. The report of the Kinges death comeing amongst the soldyers (quite contrarie to expectations), yet made them fight the braver, as seemeing to resolve to revenge his death or dye

— from Fleetwood's letter dated Stettin, 22 November 1632

He then served as the commandant of a Swedish garrison in Prussia in 1633. The Swedish Chancellor Axel Oxenstierna, seeking a closer alliance and further recruits, sent Fleetwood to the Stuart court in 1636 and 1637. En route to England in 1637 George, now a colonel, met queen Elizabeth Stuart, Queen of Bohemia. He obtained funds and permission to levy from king Charles I of England.

In 1639 he sailed with Covenanters through the Danish Sound to take up service first as a commandant at Greifswald and then at Kolberg the following year. During his time at Kolberg he wrote daily to Count Forbes, the vice-governor in Pomerania.

In 1640 he married Brita Gyllenstjerna; they had four sons and two daughters.

From 1641-3 Fleetwood was colonel of the Jönköping regiment, although another source named him colonel of the Kronoberg regiment from 1641-54. In 1646 he was rewarded with land donations from the queen. He was introduced into the Swedish House of Nobility in 1649. In 1653 he was promoted to major-general of the infantry, and he became a Baron on 1 June 1654. Along with Colonel Hugh Hamilton, he was chosen to guard Karl X Gustav at his wedding.

In 1655 he was sent by Charles X as envoy extraordinary to Oliver Cromwell, in response to Bulstrode Whitelocke's embassy. He was accompanied by his eldest son, Gustavus Miles Fleetwood(1642-1705), who was enrolled among the life-guard of Charles II, and pursued his education in England. He worked for a confederation between Sweden and the English Republic. This was at the same time as Alexander Leslie and William Cranston were organizing levies of Royalists for Swedish service. George obtained at least 3000 English and Scottish troops for Swedish service in Poland and against Denmark, and some of his men served alongside Cranstoun's troops.

He was promoted to lieutenant-general in 1656 and in 1658 his regiment was at Bremen. After his return to Sweden served as military councillor in 1665.

He died 11 June 1667, and was buried at Nyköping.

== Service record ==
SWEDEN, JAMES SPENS (STRALSUND Mecklenburg-Vorpommern)
Arrived 1629-07-01, as MAJOR
Departed 1632-12-31, as LIEUTENANT- COLONEL
Capacity OFFICER, purpose MILITARY

SWEDEN, GEORGE FLEETWOOD'S REGIMENT
WERBEN, BRANDENBURG
Arrived 1631-08-01
Capacity OFFICER, purpose MILITARY
BREITENFELD, LEIPZIG, SAXONY
Arrived 1631-09-01
Capacity OFFICER, purpose MILITARY
GARTZ, BRANDENBURG
Arrived 1631-11-01
Capacity OFFICER, purpose MILITARY
LECH, BAVARIA
Arrived 1632-04-01
Capacity OFFICER, purpose MILITARY
ALTE VESTE, NURNBERG, BAVARIA
Arrived 1632-07-01
Capacity OFFICER, purpose MILITARY
LUTZEN, LEIPZIG, SAXONY
Arrived 1632-11-01
Capacity OFFICER, purpose MILITARY
LANDSBERG, BAVARIA
Arrived 1633-04-01
Capacity OFFICER, purpose MILITARY
STRALSUND (Mecklenburg-Vorpommern), POMERANIA (Pommern)
Arrived 1638-01-01
Capacity OFFICER, purpose MILITARY
STETTIN (Szczecin), POMERANIA (Pommern)
Arrived 1638-02-01
Capacity OFFICER, purpose MILITARY

SWEDEN, PRUSSIA (Preussen)
Arrived 1633-01-01, as COMMANDANT
Departed 1633-12-31, as COMMANDANT
Capacity COMMANDANT, purpose MILITARY

SWEDEN, GREIFSWALD, POMERANIA (Pommern)
Arrived 1638-01-01, as COMMANDANT
Departed 1640-12-31, as COMMANDANT
Capacity COMMANDANT, purpose MILITARY

SWEDEN, COLBERG, KOLBERG
Arrived 1641-01-01, as COMMANDANT
Departed 1650-12-31, as COMMANDANT
Capacity COMMANDANT, purpose MILITARY

SWEDEN, STUART KINGDOMS, LONDON, ENGLAND
Arrived 1636-01-01
Departed 1637-02-28, as COLONEL
Capacity ENVOY, purpose DIPLOMACY

STUART KINGDOMS, SWEDEN, STOCKHOLM
Arrived 1637-03-01
Departed 1637-04-20
Capacity AMBASSADOR, purpose DIPLOMACY

SWEDEN, STUART KINGDOMS, THE HAGUE, BOHEMIAN COURT
Arrived 1637-05-01
Capacity ENVOY, purpose DIPLOMACY

SWEDEN, ENGLAND, LONDON
Arrived 1637-06-01
Capacity AMBASSADOR, RECRUITER, purpose MILITARY, DIPLOMACY

SWEDEN, ENGLAND, LONDON
Arrived 1655-01-01
Departed 1657-12-31
Capacity ENVOY, purpose DIPLOMACY

SWEDEN, KRIGSRAD, STOCKHOLM
Arrived 1656-01-01, as LT. GENERAL
Departed 1656-12-31, as LT. GENERAL
Capacity COUNCILLOR, purpose MILITARY

ENGLAND, HELSINGBORG [SWEDEN]
Arrived 1659-01-01
Departed 1659-12-31
Capacity ENVOY, purpose DIPLOMACY

SWEDEN, ENGLAND, LONDON
Arrived 1660-01-01
Departed 1660-12-31
Capacity ENVOY, purpose DIPLOMACY

SWEDEN, JÄLUNDA [SWEDEN]
Arrived 1661-01-01
Departed 1667-06-11
Capacity KRIGSRÅD, purpose MILITARY
