= Fleetwood baronets =

Set index for Fleetwood baronets

There have been two baronetcies created for members of the Fleetwood family, an old Lancashire family, one in the Baronetage of England and one in the Baronetage of the United Kingdom. Both creations are extinct.

- Fleetwood baronets of Caldwick (1611)
- Hesketh-Fleetwood baronets of Rossall Hall (1838)

== See also ==
- Fleetwood (baronial family)
