= Knights of Buckinghamshire =

This article contains a list of the known knights of the shire who represented Buckinghamshire in the Parliament of England and similar bodies of lesser status between 1290 and 1660. It also includes details of Parliaments from 1265 to which elected knights of the shires were summoned.

== Preliminary notes ==
The parliamentary electoral constituency, representing the historic county of Buckinghamshire, was created in (1265): see Montfort's Parliament for further details and History of Buckinghamshire for maps of the historic county. This county constituency was represented by two knights of the shire until 1832 and three 1832–1885.

Knights of the shire are known to have been summoned to most parliaments from 1290 (19th Parliament of King Edward I of England) and to every one from 1320 (19th Parliament of King Edward II of England).

Although at some periods several Parliaments were held in a year, at others there were considerable gaps between Parliaments. Knights of the shire were also summoned to meetings which have not been classified as Parliaments by modern expert opinion. The names of the members in some Parliaments are not known.

The English civil year started on 25 March until 1752 (Scotland having changed to 1 January in 1600). The years used for parliaments in this article have been converted to the new style where necessary. Old style dates would be a year earlier than the new style for days between 1 January and 24 March, for example the Parliament of 18 March 1313 – 9 May 1313 (new style) would be 18 March 1312 – 9 May 1313 (old style). No attempt has been made to compensate for the eleven days which did not occur in September 1752 in both England and Scotland as well as other British controlled territories (when the day after 2 September was 14 September), so as to bring the British Empire fully in line with the Gregorian calendar.

The names of knights of the shire, taken from the list in The History and Antiquities of Buckinghamshire by George Lipscomb (unless a volume from the History of Parliament Trust on the House of Commons at a particular period is available), are given in alphabetical order for each group of representatives.

There are some minor variations in names from the source used, which unless the contrary is known, are assumed to relate to the same person. It is possible that some entries relate to different persons of the same name. Where such cases have been identified the persons have been distinguished by a Roman number after the name (in order of first election); except where the number used to distinguish different candidates of the same name during the same period, by the authors of the books on the House of Commons mention in the references section, are used.

As the dates of Parliaments came from a twentieth century source and the names of persons elected came from Lipscomb (published between 1831 and 1847) it was sometimes impossible to be certain, from those sources, who served in a Parliament and who attended other meetings accorded lesser status. There is also some uncertainty as to whether Lipscomb did or did not use new style years and if so whether the method used in his list is consistent. An attempt has been made to give the best fit possible and to indicate the year (and if necessary the number within the year) from Lipscomb's list. The places of some Parliaments were indicated in footnotes to Lipscomb's list and are given here as they may assist with further research to confirm the link between specific knights of the shire and a particular Parliament.

== Knights of the shire 1265–1660 ==
The lists below commence with Montfort's Parliament in 1265, when for the first time elected representatives from counties (or shires), cities and boroughs were summoned to Parliament.

It is known that the Sheriffs of the English Counties were ordered to send knights of the shire to attend a number of Parliaments before 1265, but they were not required to have them chosen by election. No such summonses are known to have required the attendance of some citizens of cities or burgesses of other boroughs. Records of this sort of summons survive for the Oxford Parliament which was the 7th Parliament of King Henry III (assembled 27 October 1258 and presumed dissolved when writs de expensis were issued on 4 November 1258) and the 16th Parliament of the King (summoned 4 June 1264 and assembled 22 June 1264, although the date of dissolution is unknown).

The lists before 1320 exclude Parliaments to which elected commoners (representing the Commons or communities of England) were not known to have been summoned. All Parliaments are believed to have been held at Westminster, unless otherwise indicated.

=== Parliament of King Henry III ===
No.	Summoned	Elected	Assembled	Dissolved	1st member	2nd member
17th	14 December 1264	1264–65	20 January 1265	15 February 1265	unknown	unknown

=== Parliaments of King Edward I ===
No.	Summoned	Elected	Assembled	Dissolved	1st member	2nd member
1st (a)	16 February 1275	1275	25 April 1275	...	unknown	unknown
2nd (b)	1 September 1275	1275	13 October 1275	24 October 1275	unknown	unknown
19th (c)	13 June 1290	1290	15 July 1290	...	John de Pateshulle	William de Turville
20th	...	1290	27 October 1290	...	unknown	unknown
21st	...	1290–91	7 January 1291	...	unknown	unknown
22nd	...	1291–92	8 January 1292	...	unknown	unknown
25th	...	?1293	> 29 March 1293	...	unknown	unknown
26th	...	1293	13 October 1293	...	unknown	unknown
27th	...	1293	> 25 December 1293	...	unknown	unknown
29th (d)	30 September 1295+	1295	27 November 1295	4 December 1295	Laurence de Bluntesdene	Roger de Tiringham
30th	26 August 1296	1296	3 November 1296	29 November 1296	unknown	unknown
33rd (e)	6 October 1297	1297	15 September 1297	14 October 1297	Robert Barry	Amery de Nowers
34th (f)	15 March 1298	March 1298	30 March 1298	...	Laurence de Bluntesdene	John de Chetewood
35th (g)	10 April 1298	1298	25 May 1298	...	unknown	unknown
39th (h)	29 December 1299	1299–00	6 March 1300	20 March 1300	Hugh de Chastillon	Robert Pogeys
39th (h)	29 December 1299	1300	6 March 1300	20 March 1300	Hugh de Chastillon	Gerard de Braybroke I
40th (i)	26 September 1300	1300–01	20 January 1301	30 January 1301	Gerard de Braybroke I	Hugh de Chastillon
42nd (j)	14 July 1302	1302	14 October 1302	21 October 1302	John de Chetewood	William de Santresdon
43rd (k)	12 November 1304	1304–05	28 February 1305	20 March 1305	Roger de Tyringham	John Neyrunt
45th (l)	5 April 1306	1306	30 May 1306	30 May 1306	William Beauchamp	John Giffard
46th (m)	3 November 1306	1306–07	20 January 1307	19 March 1307	Miles de Beauchamp	Ralph de Wedon

Notes:-

- (a) 1st: For the first time since 1264–65 the representatives of the communities of the Realm are known to have been summoned to Parliament.
- (b) 2nd: The knights of the shires only were summoned to this Parliament. No summonses were sent to the cities and boroughs, for them to send representatives.
- (c) 19th: Knights only summoned 13–14 June 1290. Assembled 23 April 1290 Lords and 15 July 1290 Commons. This is the 308th Parliament, counting backwards from the Parliament elected in 2005. (Lipscomb-knights of the shire 1290). After this Parliament it became fairly usual for the representatives of the counties, cities and boroughs to be summoned to attend Parliament and from 1320 they were always included.
- (d) 29th: Model Parliament summoned 30 September, 1 and 3 October 1295. (Lipscomb-knights of the shire 1295)
- (e) 33rd: Summoned 30 September 1297 (peers) and 6 October 1297 (knights of the shire). Assembled 9 October 1297 Lords and 15 October 1297 Commons. Met in London. (Lipscomb-knights of the shire 1297)
- (f) 34th: Met in York. (Lipscomb-knights of the shire 1298)
- (g) 35th: Summoned 10, 11 and 13 April 1298.
- (h) 39th: (39th): Resignation of Pogeys, (1300) Gerard de Braybroke [I] elected. (Lipscomb-knights of the shire 1300:1)
- (i) 40th: Met in Lincoln. Dissolved 27–30 January 1301 (when writs de expensis were issued). (Lipscomb-knights of the shire 1300:2)
- (j) 42nd: Summoned 14, 20 and 24 July 1303. Met in London. (Lipscomb-knights of the shire 1302)
- (k) 43rd: (Lipscomb-knights of the shire 1305)
- (l) 45th: Assembled and dissolved 30 May 1306. (Lipscomb-knights of the shire 1306)
- (m) 46th: Met in Carlisle. Dissolved when writs de expensis were issued 20 January 1307 (burgesses only) and 19 March 1307 (knights only). (Lipscomb-knights of the shire 1307)

=== Parliaments of King Edward II ===
No.	Summoned	Elected	Assembled	Dissolved	1st member	2nd member
1st	26 August 1307	1307	13 October 1307	16 October 1307	unknown	unknown
2nd	19 January 1308	1308	3 March 1308	...	unknown	unknown
5th (a)	4 March 1309	1309	27 April 1309	13 May 1309	Gerard de Braybroke II	John Giffard
8th (b)	16 June 1311	1311	8 August 1311	18 December 1311	Ralph de Wedon	Robert Malet
9th (c)	3 June 1312	1312	20 August 1312	16 December 1312	Ralph de Bellofago	Robert Malet
10th (d)	8 January 1313	1313	18 March 1313	9 May 1313	Ralph de Wedon	Robert Malet
11th (f)	23 May 1313	1313	8 July 1313	27 July 1313	Robert de Tothale	Robert Malet
12th (g)	26 July 1313	1313	23 September 1313	15 November 1313	John de Adingrave	Masculin de Chastillon
13th (h)	29 July 1314	1314	9 September 1314	27/28 September 1314	Miles de Beauchamp	Robert Malet
14th (i)	24 October 1314	1314–15	20 January 1315	9 March 1315	unknown	unknown
15th (j)	16 October 1315	1315–16	27 January 1316	20 February 1316	Nicholas de Turville	John Giffard de Boef
16th	24–25 August 1318	1318	20 October 1318	9 December 1318	unknown	unknown
17th (l)	20 March 1319	1319	6 May 1319	25 May 1319	John de la Haye	John de la Penne
19th	5 August 1320	1320	6 October 1320	25/26 October 1320	unknown	unknown
20th	15 May 1321	1321	15 July 1321	22 August 1321	unknown	unknown
21st (m)	14 March 1322	1322	2 May 1322	19 May 1322	Ralph de Wedon	Robert Malet
22nd (n)	18 September 1322	1322	14 November 1322	29 November 1322	Alan de Leaumes	Robert Malet
23rd (o)	20 November 1323	1323–24	23 February 1324	18 March 1324	Philip de Aylesbury	Robert Malet
24th (p)	6 May 1325	1325	25 June 1325	...	Thomas de Sakevill	James Freysel
25th	10 October 1325	1325	18 November 1325	5 December 1325	unknown	unknown
26th (q)	28 October 1326	1326–27	7 January 1327	20 January 1327	Andrew de St. Liz	Robert Malet

Note:-

- (a) 5th: (Lipscomb-knights of the shire 1309)
- (b) 8th: Met at London. (Lipscomb-knights of the shire 1311)
- (c) 9th: (Lipscomb-knights of the shire 1312:1)
- (d) 10th: (Lipscomb-knights of the shire 1312:2)
- (e) Robert Barry, ? (Lipscomb-knight of the shire 1313:1) not associated with a Parliament as far as is known
- (f) 11th: (Lipscomb-knights of the shire 1313:2)
- (g) 12th: (Lipscomb-knights of the shire 1313:3)
- (h) 13th: (Lipscomb-knights of the shire 1314)
- (i) 14th: John Blaket, Robert Malet (Lipscomb-knights of the shire 1315:1) or John Giffard, Nicholas de Turville (at York) (Lipscomb-knights of the shire 1315:2) uncertain which pair were elected to this Parliament and which to a meeting of lesser status
- (j) 15th: Met at Lincoln. (Lipscomb-knights of the shire 1316)
- (k) Nicholas de Turville (3), John de Olney (1) (Council at Lincoln) (Lipscomb-knights of the shire 1317) not associated with a body classified as a Parliament
- (l) 17th: (Lipscomb-knights of the shire 1319)
- (m) 21st: (Lipscomb-knights of the shire 1322)
- (n) 22nd: Met at York. (Lipscomb-knights of the shire 1323)
- (o) 23rd: (Lipscomb-knights of the shire 1324)
- (p) 24th: Met at London. (Lipscomb-knights of the shire 1325)
- (q) 26th: continued into the next reign (Lipscomb-knights of the shire 1326)

=== Parliaments of King Edward III ===
No.	Summoned	Elected	Assembled	Dissolved	1st member	2nd member
1st	...	...	...	9 March 1327	unknown	unknown
2nd	7 August 1327	1327	15 September 1327	23 September 1327	unknown	unknown
3rd	10 December 1327	1327–28	7 February 1328	5 March 1328	unknown	unknown
4th	5 March 1328	1328	24 April 1328	14 May 1328	unknown	unknown
5th	28 August 1328	1328	16 October 1328	22 February 1329	unknown	unknown
6th	25 January 1330	1330	11 March 1330	21 March 1330	unknown	unknown
7th	23 October 1330	1330	26 November 1330	9 December 1330	unknown	unknown
8th	16 July 1331	1331	30 September 1331	9 October 1331	unknown	unknown
9th	27 January 1332	1332	16 March 1332	21 March 1332	unknown	unknown
10th	20 July 1332	1332	9 September 1332	12 September 1332	unknown	unknown
11th	20 October 1332	1332	4 December 1332	27 January 1333	unknown	unknown
12th	2 January 1334	1334	21 February 1334	2 March 1334	unknown	unknown
13th	24 July 1334	1334	19 September 1334	23 September 1334	unknown	unknown
14th	1 April 1335	1335	26 May 1335	3 June 1335	unknown	unknown
15th	22 January 1336	1336	11 March 1336	20 March 1336	unknown	unknown
16th	29 November 1336	1336–37	3 March 1337	c.16 March 1337	unknown	unknown
17th	20 December 1337	1337–38	3 February 1338	14 February 1338	unknown	unknown
18th	15 November 1338	1338–39	3 February 1339	17 February 1339	unknown	unknown
19th	25 August 1339	1339	13 October 1339	c.3 November 1339	unknown	unknown
20th	16 November 1339	1339–40	20 January 1340	19 February 1340	unknown	unknown
21st	21 February 1340	1340	29 March 1340	10 May 1340	unknown	unknown
22nd	30 May 1340	1340	12 July 1340	26 July 1340	unknown	unknown
23rd	3 March 1341	1341	23 April 1341	27–28 May 1341	unknown	unknown
24th	24 February 1343	1343	28 April 1343	20 May 1343	unknown	unknown
25th	20 April 1344	1344	7 June 1344	28 June 1344	unknown	unknown
26th	30 July 1346	1346	11 September 1346	20 September 1346	unknown	unknown
27th	13 November 1347	1348–48	14 January 1348	12 February 1348	unknown	unknown
28th	14 February 1348	1348	31 March 1348	13 April 1348	unknown	unknown
29th	25 November 1350	1350–51	9 February 1351	1 March 1351	unknown	unknown
30th	15 November 1351	1351–52	13 January 1352	11 February 1352	unknown	unknown
31st	15 March 1354	1354	28 April 1354	20 May 1354	unknown	unknown
32nd	20 September 1355	1355	23 November 1355	30 November 1355	unknown	Roger de Puttenham
33rd	15 February 1357	1357	17 April 1357	8–16 May 1357	unknown	unknown
34th	15 December 1357	1357–58	5 February 1358	27 February 1358	unknown	
35th	3 April 1360	1360	15 May 1360	...	unknown	unknown
36th	20 November 1360	1360–61	24 January 1361	18 February 1361	unknown	unknown
37th	14 August 1362	1362	13 October 1362	17 November 1362	unknown	unknown
38th	1 June 1363	1363	6 October 1363	30 October 1363	unknown	Roger de Puttenham
39th	4 December 1364	1364–65	20 January 1365	17 February 1365	unknown	unknown
40th	20 January 1366	1366	4 May 1366	11 May 1366	unknown	Roger de Puttenham
41st	24 February 1368	1368	1 May 1368	21 May 1368	unknown	Roger de Puttenham
42nd	6 April 1369	1369	3 June 1369	11 June 1369	unknown	Roger de Puttenham
43rd	8 January 1371	1371	24 February 1371	29 March 1371	unknown	unknown
44th	1 September 1372	1372	3 November 1372	24 November 1372	unknown	unknown
45th	4 October 1373	1373	21 November 1373	10 December 1373	unknown	unknown
46th	28 December 1375	1375–76	28 April 1376	10 July 1376	unknown	unknown
47th	1 December 1376	1376–77	27 January 1377	2 March 1377	Sir John Aylesbury	unknown

- continued from last reign-9 March 1327 (1st): Andrew de St. Liz (1b), Robert Malet (10b) (Westminster) (Lipscomb-knights of the shire 1326)
- 15 September 1327 – 23 September 1327 (2nd): John de la Penne (2), Andrew de St. Liz (2) (Lipscomb-knights of the shire 1327:1)
- 7 February 1328 – 5 March 1328 (3rd): John Blaket (1), Masculin de Chastillon (2) (Lincoln) (Lipscomb-knights of the shire 1327:2)
- 24 April 1328 – 14 May 1328 (4th): John Blaket (2), Roger de Tourney (1) (York) (Lipscomb-knights of the shire 1328)
- 16 October 1328 – 22 February 1329 (5th): John de Mareschal (1), James Freysel (2) (New Sarum) (Lipscomb-knights of the shire 1329:1) or John de la Haye (2), Andrew de St. Liz (3) (Parliament at York) (Lipscomb-knights of the shire 1329:2) or Masculin de Chastillon (3), Andrew de St. Liz (4) (Northampton) (Lipscomb-knights of the shire 1329:3) uncertain which pair were elected to this Parliament and which to a meeting of lesser status
- 11 March 1330 – 21 March 1330 (6th): John Blaket (3), Roger de Tyringham (3) (York) (Lipscomb-knights of the shire 1329:4)
- 26 November 1330 – 9 December 1330 (7th): John de Mareschal (2), James Freysel (3) (New Sarum) (Lipscomb-knights of the shire 1330)
- 30 September 1331 – 9 October 1331 (8th): Masculin de Chastillon (4), James Freysel (4) (Westminster) (Lipscomb-knights of the shire 1331:1)
- 16 March 1332 – 21 March 1332 (9th): John Fitz-Ralph de Mareschal (1), Ralph de Wedon (5) (Winchester) (Lipscomb-knights of the shire 1331:2)
- 9 September 1332 – 12 September 1332 (10th): Richard de Chastillon (1), John de Cifrewast (1) (Westminster) (Lipscomb-knights of the shire 1332)
- 4 December 1332 – 27 January 1333 (11th): John de Adingrave (2), Masculin de Chastillon (5) (Lipscomb-knights of the shire 1333:1)
- 21 February 1334 – 2 March 1334 (12th): Masculin de Chastillon (6), John de Stretle (1) (Lipscomb-knights of the shire 1333:2)
- 19 September 1334 – 23 September 1334 (13th): Thomas Blaket (1), Robert Malet (11) (York) (Lipscomb-knights of the shire 1334)
- 26 May 1335 – 3 June 1335 (14th): Thomas Blaket (2), John de Stretle (2) (Westminster) (Lipscomb-knights of the shire 1335:1)
- 11 March 1336 – 20 March 1336 (15th): Thomas Blaket (3), Robert Malet (12) (York) (Lipscomb-knights of the shire 1335:2)
- 3 March 1337–c. 16 March 1337 (16th): Gerard de Braybroke II (2), John de Hamstede (1) (Lipscomb-knights of the shire 1336)
- 3 February 1338 – 14 February 1338 (17th): William de Berkhamstede (1), Thomas de la Haye (1) (Council at Northampton) (Lipscomb-knights of the shire 1337)
- 3 February 1339 – 17 February 1339 (18th): Philip de Aylesbury (2), Walter Poule (1) (Parliament at Westminster) (Lipscomb-knights of the shire 1338)
- 13 October 1339–c. 3 November 1339 (19th): John Bryan (1), Richard le Warde (1) (Council at Northampton) (Lipscomb-knights of the shire 1339:1)
- 20 January 1340 – 19 February 1340 (20th): John Blaket (4), John de Chetyngton (1)(Parliament at Westminster) (Lipscomb-knights of the shire 1339:2)
- 29 March 1340 – 10 May 1340 (21st): Philip de Aylesbury (3), Thomas Reynes (1) (Lipscomb-knights of the shire 1340:1)
- 12 July 1340 – 26 July 1340 (22nd): Philip de Aylesbury (4), Richard Passelewe (1) (Lipscomb-knights of the shire 1340:2)
- 23 April 1341–27/28 May 1341 (23rd): Philip de Aylesbury (5), Roger de Tyringham (4) (Lipscomb-knights of the shire 1341:1) or Alan de Leaumes (2), Robert Malet (12) (Lipscomb-knights of the shire 1341:2) or Gerard de Braybroke II (3), Richard de la Vache (1) (Lipscomb-knights of the shire 1341:3) or Philip de Aylesbury (5), John Giffard (5) (Lipscomb-knights of the shire 1341:4) uncertain which pair of knights of the shire were elected to this Parliament and which to meetings of lesser status
- 28 April 1343 – 20 May 1343 (24th): John de Chastillon (1), Richard de Chastillon (2) (Lipscomb-knights of the shire 1342)
- 7 June 1344 – 28 June 1344 (25th): Philip de Aylesbury (6), Robert Malet (13) (Lipscomb-knights of the shire 1344:1) or John de Chastillon (2), Thomas de Reynes (2) (Lipscomb-knights of the shire 1344:2) or Gerard de Braybroke (x), ? (Lipscomb-knights of the shire 1345)uncertain which pair were elected to this Parliament and which to a meeting of lesser status
- 11 September 1346 – 20 September 1346 (26th): ?
- 14 January 1348 – 12 February 1348 (27th): Thomas de Reynes (3), Alexander de Sanderton (1) (Lipscomb-knights of the shire 1347)
- 31 March 1348 – 13 April 1348 (28th): Henry de Chalfhunte (1), John le Veinour (1) (Lipscomb-knights of the shire 1348)
- Henry Fermband (1), Henry de Chalfhunte (2) (Lipscomb-knights of the shire 1349:1) and Henry de Chalfhunte (3), John le Veinour (2) (Lipscomb-knights of the shire 1349:2) not associated with a body classified as a Parliament
- 9 February 1351 – 1 March 1351 (29th): ?
- 13 January 1352 – 11 February 1352 (30th): Gerard de Braybroke III (1), Hugh de Kymbell (1) (Lipscomb-knights of the shire 1352)
- Gerard de Braybroke III (2), John de Hampden (1) (Lipscomb-knights of the shire 1353:1) and Geffrey de Lacy (1), ? (Council at Westminster) (Lipscomb-knights of the shire 1353:2) not associated with a body classified as a Parliament
- 28 April 1354 – 20 May 1354 (31st): Geffrey de Lucy (2), ? (Lipscomb-knights of the shire 1354)
- 23 November 1355 – 30 November 1355 (32nd): Geffrey de Lucy (3), Roger de Puttenham (1) (Parliament at Westminster) (Lipscomb-knights of the shire 1355)
- 17 April 1357-8/16 May 1357 (33rd): John de Chastillon (3), Geffrey de Lucy (3)
- 5 February 1358 – 27 February 1358 (34th): John de Hagmondesham (1), Roger de Puttenham (2)
- 15 May 1360 (35th): ?
- 24 January 1361 – 18 February 1361 (36th): Geffrey de Lucy (4), J. Hunt (1)
- 13 October 1362 – 17 November 1362 (37th): Robert Barry (1), Nicholas Trimenel {1)
- 6 October 1363 – 30 October 1363 (38th): Thomas de Arderne (1), Roger de Puttenham (3)
- 20 January 1365 – 17 February 1365 (39th): John de Hampden (1), ?
- 4 May 1366 – 11 May 1366 (40th): Thomas de Missynden (1), Roger de Puttenham (4)
- 1 May 1368 – 21 May 1368 (41st): John de Arderne (1), Roger de Puttenham (5)
- 3 June 1369 – 11 June 1369 (42nd): John de Arderne (2), Roger de Puttenham (6)
- 24 February 1371 – 29 March 1371 (43rd): Fulk de Bermyngeham (1), Thomas de Reynes (4)
- 3 November 1372 – 24 November 1372 (44th): Fulk de Bermyngeham (2), ?
- 21 November 1373 – 10 December 1373 (45th): John de Arderne (3), Geffrey de Lucy (5)
- 28 April 1376 – 10 July 1376 (46th): ? (The Good Parliament).
- 27 January 1377 – 2 March 1377 (47th): ? (The Bad Parliament).

=== Parliaments of King Richard II ===
No.	Summoned	Elected	Assembled	Dissolved	1st member	2nd member
1st	4 August 1377	1377	13 October 1377	5 December 1377	Sir Edmund atte Pole	Sir John de Aylesbury
2nd	3 September 1378	1378	20 October 1378	16 November 1378	Sir John de Aylesbury	Sir Thomas Sakevill
3rd	16 February 1379	1379	24 April 1379	27 May 1379	Sir William de Molins	Sir Thomas Sakevill
4th	20 October 1379	1379–80	16 January 1380	3 March 1380	Sir John de Aylesbury	Sir Thomas Sakevill
5th	26 August 1380	1380	5 November 1380	6 December 1380	Sir John de Bermyngeham	Robert de Luton
6th	16 July 1381	1381	3 November 1381	25 February 1382	Sir John de Aylesbury	Sir Thomas Sakevill
7th	24 March 1382	1382	7 May 1382	22 May 1382	Sir John de Aylesbury	John de Cheyne
8th	9 August 1382	1382	6 October 1382	24 October 1382	unknown (a)	unknown (a)
9th	7 January 1383	1383	23 February 1383	10 March 1383	John Broughton	Sir Thomas Sakevill
10th	20 August 1383	1383	26 October 1383	26 November 1383	Sir Edmund atte Pole	Sir Thomas Sakevill
11th	3 March 1384	1384	29 April 1384	27 May 1384	unknown	unknown
12th	28 September 1384	1384	12 November 1384	14 December 1384	unknown	unknown
13th	3 September 1385	1385	20 October 1385	6 December 1385	unknown	unknown
14th	8 August 1386	1386	1 October 1386	28 November 1386	Sir John Chetwode	Sir Thomas Sackville
15th	17 December 1387	1387–88	3 February 1388	4 June 1388	Sir Robert Luton	Sir Philip de la Vache
16th	28 July 1388	1388	9 September 1388	17 October 1388	Roger Dayrell	Sir Thomas Sackville
17th	6 December 1389	1389–90	17 January 1390	2 March 1390	Sir John Aylesbury	Sir Robert Luton
18th	12 September 1390	1390	12 November 1390	3 December 1390	Roger Dayrell	Edward Durdent
19th	7 September 1391	1391	3 November 1391	2 December 1391	Sir Thomas Aylesbury	John Broughton
20th	23 November 1392	1392–93	20 January 1393	10 February 1393	Sir Edward Missenden	Alan Ayot
21st	13 November 1393	1393–94	27 January 1394	6 March 1394	Roger Dayrell	Sir Thomas Sackville
22nd	20 November 1394	1394–95	27 January 1395	15 February 1395	Sir John Chetwode	Edward Durdent
23rd	30 November 1396	1396–97	22 January 1397	12 February 1397	John Barton	Thomas Shelley
24th	18 July 1397	1397	17 September 1397	31 January 1398	Sir Thomas Aylesbury	Thomas Shelley
25th	19 August 1399	1389	30 September 1399	30 September 1399	Roger Dayrell	Edmund Hampden

Note:-

- (a) 8th: John de Braybroke or Sir Thomas Sakevill, John Marche or John Tyringham uncertain which pair were elected to this Parliament and which to a meeting of lesser status.

=== Parliaments of King Henry IV ===
No.	Summoned	Elected	Assembled	Dissolved	1st member	2nd member
1st	30 September 1399	1399	6 October 1399	19 November 1399	unknown	unknown
2nd	9 September 1400	1400–01	20 January 1401	10 March 1401	John Barton	Thomas Durant
3rd	19 June 1402	1402	30 September 1402	25 November 1402	Sir Richard Arches	Edmund Hampden
4th	20 October 1403	1403–04	14 January 1404	20 March 1404	John Barton	Edmund Brudenell
5th	25 August 1404	1404	6 October 1404	13 November 1404	Roger Cheyne	Robert James
6th	21 December 1405	1405–06	1 March 1406	22 December 1406	Edmund Brudenell	John Giffard
7th	26 August 1407	1407	20 October 1407	2 December 1407	John Barton	Richard Wyot
8th	26 October 1409	1409–10	27 January 1410	9 May 1410	unknown	unknown
9th	21 September 1411	1411	3 November 1411	19 December 1411	unknown	unknown
10th	1 December 1412	1412–13	3 February 1413	20 March 1413	unknown	unknown

=== Parliaments of King Henry V ===
No.	Summoned	Elected	Assembled	Dissolved	1st member	2nd member
1st	22 March 1413	1413	14 May 1413	9 June 1413	John Cheyne	John Giffard
2nd	1 December 1413	1413–14	30 April 1414	29 May 1414	John Barton II	Richard Wyot
3rd	26 September 1414	1414	19 November 1414	...	John Barton	Richard Wyot
4th	12 August 1415	1415	4 November 1415	12 November 1415	John Cheyne	Richard Wyot
5th	21 January 1416	1416	16 March 1416	May 1416	unknown	unknown
6th	3 September 1416	1416	19 October 1416	18 November 1416	unknown	unknown
7th	5 October 1417	1417	16 November 1417	17 December 1417	John Barton II	John Giffard
8th	24 August 1419	1419	16 October 1419	13 November 1419	John Barton II	Richard Wyot
9th	21 October 1420	1420	2 December 1420	...	John Hampden	William Whaplode
10th	26 February 1421	1421	2 May 1421	...	Robert James	George Longville
11th	20 October 1421	1421	1 December 1421	...	Sir John Cheyne II	Richard Wyot

=== Parliaments of King Henry VI ===
No.	Summoned	Elected	Assembled	Dissolved	1st member	2nd member
1st	29 September 1422	1422	9 November 1422	18 December 1422	John Barton jnr	Robert James
2nd	1 September 1423	1423	20 October 1423	28 February 1424	John Giffard	unknown
3rd	24 February 1425	1425	30 April 1425	14 July 1425	John Cheyne	Sir John Cheyne II
4th	7 January 1426	1426	18 February 1426	1 June 1426	Sir John Cheyne II	unknown
5th	15 July 1427	1427	13 October 1427	25 March 1428	John Cheyne	unknown
6th	12 July 1429	1429	22 September 1429	23 February 1430	unknown	unknown
7th	27 November 1430	1430–31	12 January 1431	20 March 1431	unknown	unknown
8th	25 February 1432	1432	12 May 1432	17 July 1432	Sir John Cheyne II	unknown
9th	24 May 1433	1433	8 July 1433	>c.18 December 1433	William Whaplode	unknown
10th	5 July 1435	1435	10 October 1435	23 December 1435	Sir John Cheyne II	unknown
11th	29 October 1436	1436–37	21 January 1437	27 March 1437	John Hampden	unknown
12th	26 September 1439	1439	12 November 1439	c.15–24 February 1440	unknown	unknown
13th	3 December 1441	1441–42	25 January 1442	27 March 1442	unknown	unknown
14th	13 January 1445	1445	25 February 1445	9 April 1445	Sir John Cheyne II	unknown
15th	14 December 1446	1446–47	10 February 1447	3 March 1447	Thomas Tresham	unknown
16th	2 January 1449	1449	12 February 1449	16 July 1449	unknown	unknown
17th	23 September 1449	1449	6 November 1449	c.5–8 June 1450	unknown	unknown
18th	5 September 1450	1450	6 November 1450	c.24–31 May 1451	unknown	unknown
19th	20 January 1453	1453	6 March 1453	c.16–21 April 1454	unknown	unknown
20th	26 May 1455	1455	9 July 1455	12 March 1456	unknown	unknown
21st	9 October 1459	1459	20 November 1459	20 December 1459	unknown	unknown
22nd	30 July 1460	1460	7 October 1460	c.4 March 1461	unknown	unknown
23rd	15 October 1470	1470	26 November 1470	c. 11 April 1471	unknown	unknown

=== Parliaments of King Edward IV ===
No.	Summoned	Elected	Assembled	Dissolved	1st member	2nd member
1st	23 May 1461	1461	4 November 1461	6 May 1462	unknown	unknown
2nd	22 December 1462	1462–63	29 April 1463	28 March 1465	unknown	unknown
3rd	28 February 1467	1467	3 June 1467	7 June 1468	unknown	unknown
4th	19 August 1472	1472	6 October 1472	14 March 1475	unknown	unknown
5th	20 November 1477	1477–78	16 January 1478	26 February 1478	unknown	unknown
6th	15 November 1482	1482–83	20 January 1483	18 February 1483	unknown	unknown

=== Parliament of King Richard III ===
No.	Summoned	Elected	Assembled	Dissolved	1st member	2nd member
1st	9 December 1483	1483–84	23 January 1484	20 February 1484	unknown	unknown

=== Parliaments of King Henry VII ===
No.	Summoned	Elected	Assembled	Dissolved	1st member	2nd member
1st	15 September 1485	1485	7 November 1485	c. 4 March 1486	unknown	unknown
2nd	...	1487	9 November 1487	c. 18 December 1487	unknown	unknown
3rd	...	?1488–89	13 January 1489	27 February 1490	unknown	unknown
4th	12 August 1491	1491	17 October 1491	5 March 1492	unknown	unknown
5th	15 September 1495	1495	14 October 1495	21–22 December 1495	unknown	unknown
6th	20 November 1496	1496–97	16 January 1497	13 March 1497	unknown	unknown
7th	...	?1503–04	25 January 1504	c. 1 April 1504	unknown	unknown

=== Parliaments of King Henry VIII ===
No.	Summoned	Elected	Assembled	Dissolved	1st member	2nd member
1st	17 October 1509	1509–10	21 January 1510	23 February 1510	unknown	unknown
2nd	28 November 1511	1511–12	4 February 1512	4 March 1514	unknown	unknown
3rd	23 November 1514	1514–15	5 February 1515	22 December 1515	unknown	unknown
4th	...	1523	15 April 1523	13 August 1523	unknown	unknown
5th	9 August 1529	1529	3 November 1529	14 April 1536	Sir Andrew Windsor (a)	Sir John Russell
5th	9 August 1529	after 1532	3 November 1529	14 April 1536	Sir Francis Bryan	Sir John Russell
6th	27 April 1536	1536	8 June 1536	18 July 1536	unknown	unknown
7th	1 March 1539	1539	28 April 1539	24 July 1540	Sir John Dauntesey	Sir Francis Bryan
8th	23 November 1541	1541–42	16 January 1542	28 March 1544	Sir Francis Bryan	Sir Anthony Lee
9th	1 December 1544	1544–45	23 November 1545	31 January 1547	Sir Francis Bryan	Francis Russell

Note:-

- (a) Windsor was created 1st Baron Windsor 3 November 1529.

=== Parliaments of King Edward VI ===
No.	Summoned	Elected	Assembled	Dissolved	1st member	2nd member
1st	2 August 1547	1547	4 November 1547	15 April 1552	Sir Francis Russell	Sir Anthony Lee (a)
1st	2 August 1547	8 January 1550	4 November 1547	15 April 1552	Sir Francis Russell	Sir Thomas Windsor
2nd	5 January 1553	1553	1 March 1553	31 March 1553	Edmund Verney	William Dormer

Note:-

- (a) Lee died in office.

=== Parliaments of Queen Mary I ===
No.	Summoned	Elected	Assembled	Dissolved	1st member	2nd member
1st	14 August 1553	1553	5 October 1553	5 December 1553	Sir Edmund Peckham	Sir Robert Drury [II]
2nd	17 February 1554	1554	2 April 1554	3 May 1554	Sir Robert Peckham	Sir George Gifford [II]
3rd	3 October 1554	1554	12 November 1554	16 January 1555	Sir Edmund Peckham	Thomas Denton
4th	3 September 1555	1555	21 October 1555	9 December 1555	Edmund Verney	Francis Verney
5th	6 December 1557	1557–58	20 January 1558	17 November 1558	Sir William Dormer	Sir Henry Lee

=== Parliaments of Queen Elizabeth I ===
No.	Summoned	Elected	Assembled	Dissolved	1st member	2nd member
1st	5 December 1558	28 December 1558	23 January 1559	8 May 1559	Sir Henry Lee	Paul Darrell
2nd	10 November 1562	1562–63	11 January 1563	2 January 1567	Thomas Fleetwood	William Hawtrey
3rd	...	1571	2 April 1571	29 May 1571	Sir Henry Lee	Sir William Dormer
4th	28 March 1572	1572	8 May 1572	19 April 1583	Sir Henry Lee	John Croke [II]
5th	12 October 1584	1584	23 November 1584	14 September 1585	Miles Sandys	Griffith Hampden
6th	15 September 1586	1586	15 October 1586	23 March 1587	Francis Goodwin	John Borlase
7th	18 September 1588	1588–89	4 February 1589	29 March 1589	John Fortescue [I]	Thomas Tasburgh
8th	4 January 1593	1593	18 February 1593	10 April 1593	Sir John Fortescue [I]	Sir Robert Dormer
9th	23 August 1597	1597	24 October 1597	9 February 1598	Sir John Fortescue [I]	Francis Goodwin
10th	11 September 1601	7 October 1601	27 October 1601	19 December 1601	Francis Fortescue	Alexander Hampden

=== Parliaments of King James I ===
No.	Summoned	Elected	Assembled	Dissolved	1st member	2nd member
1st	31 January 1604	1604	19 March 1604	9 February 1611	William Fleetwood	Francis Goodwin (a)
1st	31 January 1604	160x	19 March 1604	9 February 1611	William Fleetwood	Christopher Pigott (b)
1st	31 January 1604	160x	19 March 1604	9 February 1611	William Fleetwood	Anthony Tyringham
2nd	...	?1614	5 April 1614	7 June 1614	Sir Francis Goodwin	Sir William Borlase
3rd	13 November 1620	1620–21	16 January 1621	8 February 1622	Sir Francis Goodwin	Sir William Fleetwood
4th	20 December 1623	1623–24	12 February 1624	27 March 1625	Sir Francis Goodwin	Sir Thomas Denton

Notes:-

- (a) Goodwin was declared not duly elected.
- (b) Pigott was expelled from the House of Commons.

=== Parliaments of King Charles I ===
No.	Summoned	Elected	Assembled	Dissolved	1st member	2nd member
1st	2 April 1625	1625	17 May 1625	12 August 1625	Sir Francis Goodwin	Henry Bulstrode
2nd	20 December 1625	1626	6 February 1626	15 June 1626	Sir Francis Goodwin	Sir Thomas Denton
3rd	31 January 1628	1628	17 March 1628	10 March 1629	Sir Edward Coke	Sir William Fleetwood
No parliament held
4th	20 February 1640	1640	13 April 1640	5 May 1640	John Hampden	Arthur Goodwin
5th	24 September 1640	1640	3 November 1640	16 March 1660	John Hampden	Arthur Goodwin
5th	24 September 1640	?1643	3 November 1640	16 March 1660	George Fleetwood	Edmund West

=== Parliaments of the Commonwealth ===
The Long Parliament or the selection of members from it known as the Rump Parliament functioned de facto during part of the Commonwealth of England period. It existed (in a sense) de jure 1640–1660, as under a pre-English Civil War law, the Long Parliament could not be lawfully dissolved without its own consent which it did not give until 1660. As it was a Parliament originally summoned by King Charles I, the overall dates of the Long Parliament are given in the previous section.

The Barebones Parliament was an appointed body, so the county was not as such represented in it. That body was summoned on 20 June 1653, first met on 4 July 1653 and was dissolved on 12 December 1653.

=== Parliaments of the Protectorate ===
During the Protectorate the county was allocated five representatives in the First and the Second Protectorate Parliaments (summoned 1 June 1654 and 10 July 1656 respectively), before reverting to two for the Third Protectorate Parliament (summoned 9 December 1658).

The boroughs of Aylesbury, Buckingham Town and Wycombe retained one seat each in the first two Parliaments, but the traditional pattern of constituencies and of seats was reintroduced for the third.

No.	Assembled	Dissolved	1st member	2nd member	3rd member	4th member	5th member
1st	3 September 1654	22 January 1655	Bulstrode Whitelocke	Richard Ingoldsby	George Fleetwood	Sir Richard Pigot	Richard Greenville
2nd	17 September 1656	4 February 1658	Bulstrode Whitelocke	Richard Ingoldsby	Richard Hampden	Sir Richard Pigot	Richard Greenville
3rd	27 January 1659	22 April 1659	Richard Greenville	William Bowyer			

== Index ==
- John de Adingrave 1313:3 1333:1
- Philip de Aylesbury 1324 1338 1340:1 1340:2 1341:1 1341:4 1344:1
- Robert Barry 1297 1313:1
- Miles de Beauchamp 1307 1314
- William Beauchamp 1306
- Ralph de Bellofago 1312:1
- William de Berkhamstede 1337
- John Blaket 1315:1 1327:2 1328 1329:4 1339:2
- Thomas Blaket 1334 1335:1 1335:2
- Laurence de Bluntesdene 1295 1298
- Gerard de Braybroke I 1300:1 1300:2
- Gerard de Braybroke II 1309 1336 1341:3
- Gerard de Braybroke ? 1345
- Gerard de Braybroke III 1352 1353:1
- John Bryan 1339:1
- Henry de Chalfhunte 1348 1349:1 1349:2
- Hugh de Chastillon 1300:1 1300:2
- John de Chastillon 1342 1344:2
- Masculin de Chastillon 1313:3 1327:2 1329:3 1331:1 1333:1 1333:2
- Richard de Chastillon 1332 1342
- John de Chetewood 1298 1302
- John de Chetyngton 1339:2
- John de Cifrewast 1332
- Henry Fermband 1349:1
- James Freysel 1325 1329:1 1330 1331:1
- John Giffard 1306 1309 1315:2 (de Boef) 1316 1341:4
- John de Hampden 1353:1
- John de Hamstede 1336
- John de la Haye 1319 1329:2
- Thomas de la Haye 1337
- Hugh de Kymbell 1352
- Geffrey de Lacy 1353:2 1354 1355
- Alan de Leaumes 1323 1341:2
- Robert Malet 1311 1312:1 1312:2 1313:2 1314 1315:1 1322 1323 1324 1326 1334 1335:2 1341:2 1344:1
- John de Mareschal (1) 1329:1 1330
- John Fitz-Ralph de Mareschal 1331:2
- John Neyrunt 1305
- Amery de Nowers 1297
- John de Olney 1317
- Richard Passelewe 1340:2
- John de Pateshulle 1290
- John de la Penne 1319 1327:1
- Robert Pogeys 1300:1
- Walter Poule 1338
- Roger de Puttenham 1355
- Thomas de Reynes 1340:1 1344:2 1347
- Andrew de St. Liz 1326 1327:1 1329:2 1329:3
- Thomas de Sakevill 1325
- Alexander de Sanderton 1347
- William de Santresdon 1302
- John de Stretle 1333:2 1335:1
- Robert de Tothale 1313:2
- Roger de Tourney 1328
- Nicholas de Turville 1315:2 1316 1317
- William de Turville 1290
- Roger de Tyringham 1295 1305 1329:4 1341:1
- Richard de la Vache 1341:3
- John le Veinour 1348 1349:2
- Richard le Warde 1339:1
- Ralph de Wedon 1307 1311 1312:2 1322 1331:2

== See also ==
- List of MPs for Buckinghamshire- MPs from 1660 onwards.
- List of former United Kingdom Parliament constituencies
- Unreformed House of Commons
- List of parliaments of England
- Duration of English parliaments before 1660
