= William Fleetwood (died 1630) =

English politician

Sir William Fleetwood (1563 – 13 December 1630) was an English politician who sat in the House of Commons at various times between 1584 and 1628.

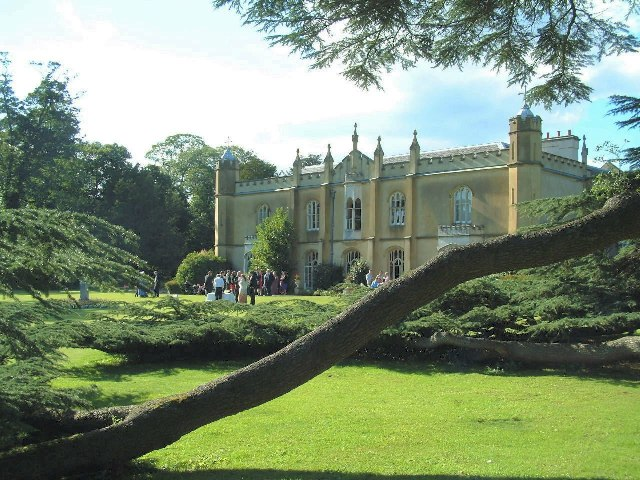
Missenden Abbey, Buckinghamshire

Fleetwood was the eldest son of William Fleetwood of Great Missenden, Buckinghamshire and his wife Marian Barley, daughter of John Barley of Kingsey, Buckinghamshire. He was admitted at Middle Temple in 1584 and was readmitted in 1592 after some dispute. In 1584, Fleetwood was elected Member of Parliament for Preston where his father was the recorder. In 1586 he was elected MP for Poole.

Fleetwood succeeded his father in 1594 to considerable estates, including the abbey of Great Missenden. He became J.P. for Berkshire and Buckinghamshire by 1597. He was surveyor of lands in north parts, Duchy of Lancaster in 1603 and was knighted in the same year. In 1604 he was elected MP for Buckinghamshire. He was elected MP for Buckinghamshire again in 1621 and was High Sheriff of Buckinghamshire for 1622–23. He was re-elected MP for Buckinghamshire in 1624 and again in 1628, and sat until 1629 when King Charles decided to rule without parliament for eleven years.

Fleetwood died at the age of 66 at Great Missenden and buried at Great Missenden parish church.

Fleetwood married Anne Barton, daughter of Ralph Barton of Smithills Hall, near Bolton, Lancashire, and had seven sons and seven daughters. His wife died in 1621.

Parliament of England
Preceded by James Hodgkinson; George Horsey	Member of Parliament for Preston; 1584; With: Thomas Cromwell	Succeeded by John Brogrove; Sir Thomas Hesketh
Preceded by Francis Mills; Thomas Vincent	Member of Parliament for Poole; 1586; With: Francis Mills	Succeeded by Henry Ashley; Edward Man
Preceded by Francis Fortescue; Alexander Hampden	Member of Parliament for Buckinghamshire; 1604–1611, 1621–22; With: Sir Francis Goodwin 1604; Christopher Pigott 1604–1611; Sir Francis Goodwin 1621–1622	Succeeded by Sir Francis Goodwin; Henry Bulstrode
Preceded by Sir Francis Goodwin; Sir Thomas Denton	Member of Parliament for Buckinghamshire; 1628–1629; With: Sir Edward Coke	Parliament suspended until 1640
