= Royal Buckinghamshire Militia (King's Own) =

Auxiliary unit of the British Army

Buckinghamshire Militia Royal Buckinghamshire Militia (King's Own) 3rd (Royal Bucks Militia) Bn, Oxfordshire Light Infantry
- Active: 1558–31 July 1908
- Country: England (1558–1707); Kingdom of Great Britain (1707–1800); United Kingdom (1801–1908)
- Branch: Militia
- Role: Infantry
- Size: 1 Battalion
- Part of: Oxfordshire Light Infantry
- Garrison/HQ: High Wycombe

Commanders
- Notable commanders: John Wilkes, MP; George Nugent-Temple-Grenville, 1st Marquess of Buckingham; Richard Temple-Nugent-Brydges-Chandos-Grenville, 1st Duke of Buckingham and Chandos; Robert Carrington, 2nd Baron Carrington; Charles Wynn-Carington, 1st Marquess of Lincolnshire

The Royal Buckinghamshire Militia (King's Own), originally the Buckinghamshire Militia, was an auxiliary military force in Buckinghamshire in South East England. From their formal organisation as Trained Bands in 1558 the Militia of Buckinghamshire served during times of international tension and all of Britain's major wars. They provided internal security and home defence but sometimes operated further afield, including Ireland and France, relieving regular troops from routine garrison duties, and acting as a source of trained officers and men for the Regular Army. The regiment later became a battalion of the Oxfordshire Light Infantry, but was disbanded in 1908.

== Early History ==
The English militia was descended from the Anglo-Saxon Fyrd, the military force raised from the freemen of the shires under command of their Sheriff. It continued under the Norman kings, notably at the Battle of the Standard (1138). The force was reorganised under the Assizes of Arms of 1181 and 1252, and again by King Edward I's Statute of Winchester of 1285. The main threats were from Scotland, Wales or France: as an inland county in southern England, Buckinghamshire avoided most of the demands. Nevertheless, it was required to send an officer and 16 mounted archers on the Scottish expedition of 1335, and sometimes provided troops to garrison Portsmouth when it was threatened by the French. Although Buckinghamshire did supply some troops for overseas campaigns, these were paid men or feudal retinues.

== Buckinghamshire Trained Bands ==
The legal basis of the militia was updated by two Acts of 1557 covering musters and the maintenance of horses and armour. The county militia was now under the Lord Lieutenant, assisted by the Deputy Lieutenants and Justices of the Peace (JPs). The entry into force of these Acts in 1558 is seen as the starting date for the organised county militia in England. Buckinghamshire was one of the southern counties called upon to send troops to suppress the Rising of the North in 1569. Although the militia obligation was universal, this assembly confirmed that it was impractical to train and equip every able-bodied man. After 1572 the practice was to select a proportion of men for the Trained Bands (TBs). They were trained by professional captains and muster-masters for up to 10 days each year. Musters were held about every three years when the arms and armour were inspected. In 1577, 3580 men out of 4302 able-bodied men in Buckinghamshire had no weapons. Only 200 out of the 722 armed men were selected to be trained.

The threat of invasion during the Spanish War led to an increase in training. At first the government emphasised the 17 'maritime' counties most vulnerable to attack, and it was not until 1586 that the inland counties were placed under lords-lieutenant (Lord Grey de Wilton was re-appointed for Buckinghamshire), ordered to appoint captains and muster-master corporals and to intensify training. The TBs were placed on alert in April 1588 and brought to an hour's notice in June. When warning of the invasion Armada arrived the TBs were mobilised on 23 July. Buckinghamshire assembled 600 trained infantry, comprising 120 pikemen, 240 with calivers, 180 bowmen and 60 billmen. There were also 18 lancers, 83 light horsemen and 20 with 'Petronels' (an early cavalry firearm). The Buckinghamshire horsemen were immediately sent to join Lord Hunsdon's army deployed at Brentford to defend the Queen, while the foot were ordered to join the Earl of Leicester's field army at Stratford-le-Bow by 6 August. A Troop of volunteer horse from the county also joined the Queen's army. However, on 3 August the inland counties were directed to hold back the foot, and Leicester's army was broken up shortly after Queen Elizabeth gave her Tilbury speech on 9 August, the danger having passed.

There were later invasion scares, including one in 1599 when Buckinghamshire was ordered to send 100 horse and 500 foot under Captains Thomas Pigott, Alexander Hampden and William Borlase to the army assembling at Brentford. The Buckinghamshire TBs also reinforced the London Trained Bands in 1601 to guard against disorder during the Earl of Essex's trial and subsequent execution. In 1603 the Buckinghamshire TBs joined those of Hertfrdshire and Surrey in armed camps in the London suburbs to ensure a peaceful transition on the Queen's death, when James I succeeded to the throne.

In the 16th Century little distinction was made between the militia and the troops levied by the counties for overseas expeditions, and between 1585 and 1601 Buckinghamshire supplied 636 levies for service in Ireland, 380 for France and 675 for the Netherlands. Another 100 men were sent to garrison Jersey in 1590. However, the counties usually conscripted the unemployed and criminals rather than the Trained Bandsmen – in 1585 the Privy Council had ordered the impressment of able-bodied unemployed men, and the Queen ordered 'none of her trayned-bands to be pressed'. The men were paid 'conduct money' to get to the embarkation port: the journey from Buckingham to Chester for the Irish levies was reckoned at 11 days. Replacing the weapons issued to the levies from the militia armouries was a heavy burden on the counties. Buckingham was unique in establishing a hospital for maimed ex-soldiers in 1598.

With the passing of the threat of invasion, the trained bands declined in the early 17th Century. Training for the TBs dropped to two days a year from 1601. Those assessed for taxes or horses in the shires also lobbied to have the burden reduced: Buckinghamshire mustered 78 lancers, 48 demi-lancers (half-armoured horsemen) and 28 petronels at Aylesbury in 1615, but this declined to 47 lancers, 38 light horse and 17 petronels in 1619 and 1620. At the 1619 muster the county's 600 selected foot comprised 400 musketeers, 160 pikemen and 40 billmen, indicating the gradual modernisation of the TBs' weaponry. These were organised into four equal bands of foot, each representing a group of Hundreds. Each band had three carts attached, and there were in addition 50 pioneers. From 1623 TB training was stepped up, and this was pursued enthusiastically by King Charles I who attempted to reform them into a national force or 'Perfect Militia' answering to the crown rather than local control. In 1638 the Buckinghamshire TBs consisted of 400 musketeers and 200 corslets (body armour, signifying pikemen); in addition the TB Horse comprised 47 lancers and 55 light horse.

=== Civil Wars ===
In 1639 and 1640 Charles attempted to employ the TBs for the Bishops' Wars in Scotland. However, many of those sent on this unpopular service were untrained replacements and conscripts, and many officers were corrupt or inefficient. For the First Bishops' War in 1639 Buckinghamshire was ordered in February to send 300 trained bandsmen to the royal army in Yorkshire, though only 187 actually arrived at the rendezvous at Selby in April, many of them substitutes. For the Second Bishops' War of 1640 Buckinghamshire was ordered to march 500 men to Harwich in Essex to be shipped to Scotland, but there was considerable opposition in the county. Once again, it seems that many of the trained bandsmen nationwide escaped service and raw substitutes were sent in their place. The Scottish campaign ended in failure.

Control of the TBs was one of the major points of dispute between Charles I and Parliament that led to the First English Civil War. Parliament appointed its own lords-lieutenant, including Lord Paget in Buckinghamshire. He called a muster in May 1642, when 150 of the trained bandsmen (a quarter) had turned out, but there were 160 volunteers, and another 100 TBs and 150 volunteers were expected for the next muster. The county's militia funds were used to equip and train men for Parliament. These arrangements were thrown into disarray when Paget fled to join the King, but the muster went ahead under the deputy lieutenants at Aylesbury on 17–24 June with the TBs and perhaps 1000 volunteers turning out. The TBs petitioned Parliament for a new lord lieutenant and Lord Wharton was sent. When open warfare broke out in the summer neither side made much use of the TBs beyond securing the county armouries for their own full-time troops who would serve anywhere in the country, many of whom were former trained bandsmen, or using the TBs as auxiliary units for garrisons. Henry Bulstrode, Governor of Aylesbury, formed such a regiment in 1642. (Note: The Royal Bucks Militia later erroneously claimed Bulstrode's regiment as its origin.) Because of its geographic location between London, Oxford and the North, Buckinghamshire was a battleground for these 'marching regiments' and garrisons throughout the First Civil War.

Once Parliament had re-established full control it passed new Militia Acts in 1648 and 1650 that replaced lords lieutenant with county commissioners appointed by Parliament or the Council of State. At the same time the term 'Trained Band' began to disappear. The February 1650 militia commissions for Buckinghamshire called for two 60-man troops of horse (later reduced to one troop of 100) under Major John Deverell and a foot regiment of seven 100-man companies commanded by Colonel George Fleetwood, Member of Parliament (MP) for Buckinghamshire. A number of the officers had returned to the militia after serving in the Parliamentary army. During the Scottish invasion of 1651 the Bucks Militia was sent to help secure London, but unlike many others among the revived county militias it did not serve in the Worcester Campaign.

Under the Commonwealth and Protectorate the militia operated alongside the New Model Army to control the country. Buckinghamshire was one of the counties placed under the control of Major-General Charles Fleetwood, a kinsman of Col George Fleetwood. In 1656 a smaller 'select militia' of politically trustworthy mounted troopers available to serve anywhere at 48 hours' notice was organised to support the army. In Buckinghamshire this consisted of a troop of 80 men but the select militia lapsed the following year. It was reformed by the Rump Parliament in May–June 1659 at the time of Booth's Uprising but was finally disbanded in September that year. The Convention Parliament that restored Charles II to the throne enacted a new Militia Act that returned the militia to local control, and the committee for Buckinghamshire set the county's strength at two troops of horse and a regiment of foot commanded by Sir Richard Temple, 3rd Baronet.

== Restoration Militia ==
After the Restoration of the Monarchy, the English Militia was re-established by the Militia Act of 1661 under the control of the king's lords-lieutenant, the men to be selected by parishes or paid substitutes. Companies would be trained for two days four times a year, and brought together for four days' annual regimental training. This was popularly seen as the 'Constitutional Force' to counterbalance a 'Standing Army' tainted by association with the New Model Army that had supported Cromwell's military dictatorship, and almost the whole burden of home defence and internal security was now entrusted to the militia. The militia's duties included suppressing non-conformist religious assemblies under the Conventicle Act 1664: the Buckinghamshires were frequently used to harass Baptists and Quakers in the county. From 1663 to 1666 a system of 'standing guards' was instituted, with each half troop or half company in turn doing seven days' continuous service. In the summer of 1666 during the Second Anglo-Dutch War, the standing guards were doubled to whole troops and their service extended to 14 days at a time. The invasion threat the following year was more serious: company training was completed in April and May, and when the Dutch raided the Medway in June the Bucks Militia were mobilised, detachments each of one troop and five companies being stationed at Aylesbury and Colnbrook, and a further troop at Newport Pagnell, for periods ranging from five to 13 days. In 1673 and 1684 the Bucks Militia mustered three troops of roughly 60 horse and 10 companies of just over 80 foot, all under the command of Viscount Brackley, eldest son of the Lord Lieutenant, the Earl of Bridgewater. The Bucks Militia were active in arresting suspects and seizing arms at the time of the Rye House Plot in 1683–4

The situation changed when King James II came to the throne in 1685. The militia were embodied during the Monmouth Rebellion that year, though unlike several other counties the Bucks Militia did not march to confront the rebels in the West Country, merely keeping order and arresting suspects in their own county. However, after Monmouth's defeat at the Battle of Sedgemoor James downgraded the militia in favour of building up his standing army. In Buckinghamshire, Viscount Brackley, who had succeeded his father as Earl of Bridgewater and Lord-Lieutenant of the county, was dismissed. The militia played almost no part when Prince William of Orange landed in the West Country in November 1688. The Bucks Militia were called out in late November by the new Lord-Lieutenant, Lord Jeffreys, to oppose the Prince's march, but two companies recruited around Newport Pagnell marched out to join a pro-Williamite band at Northampton. James's regime collapsed with little fighting and the Prince became King William III in the 'Glorious Revolution'.

The Bucks Militia continued to be mustered periodically under William's reign. In 1690 the regiment was among those called out for over a month in face of a French and Jacobite invasion threat, and carried out searches for illegal arms during a similar scare in 1692. In 1697 the counties were required to submit detailed lists of their militia, when the Buckinghamshires at High Wycombe consisted of one regiment of 10 companies of foot, 820 strong, under Lieutenant-Colonel Roger Chapman, with three Troops of horse totalling 177 men under Sir Dennis Hampson, 3rd Baronet, the whole under the command of Col William Cheyne, MP for Buckinghamshire.

The militia were mustered for annual training until the Treaty of Utrecht and the accession of King George I. During the Jacobite Rising in 1715 the Bucks Militia attempted to turn out but there was a shortage of horses. That year Sir Thomas Lee, 3rd Baronet, MP, was commissioned as colonel of the Bucks Militia, but thereafter the unit's activity ceased, and there was no attempt to mobilise in Buckinghamshire during the Jacobite Rising of 1745. The militia was in virtual abeyance across the whole country at this time.

== 1757 Reforms ==
Under threat of French invasion during the Seven Years' War a series of Militia Acts from 1757 reorganised the county militia regiments, the men being conscripted by means of parish ballots (paid substitutes were permitted) to serve for three years. In peacetime they assembled for 28 days' annual training, but could be embodied for permanent service in wartime. There was a property qualification for officers, who were commissioned by the lord lieutenant. An adjutant and drill sergeants were to be provided to each regiment from the Regular Army, and arms and accoutrements would be supplied when the county had secured 60 per cent of its quota of recruits.

Buckinghamshire was assessed to raise 560 men in one regiment. This was agreed at the lieutenancy meeting on 1 September 1759, which resolved to appoint Sir Francis Dashwood, 2nd Baronet, as colonel. William Drake, MP for Amersham, became lieutenant-colonel, and Sambrooke Freeman, George Grenville and John Wilkes, all MPs, were among the captains. Most of the better-off farmers, tradesmen and craftsmen found substitutes and did not serve in person. The order to issue the regiment with arms was given on 31 October 1759 and it was first embodied for permanent service on 14 May 1760.

One of the militia's routine tasks was guarding prisoners of war. In August 1760 the new regiment sent a detachment to escort 189 French prisoners from Abingdon-on-Thames to Andover, Hampshire, and another to take 59 prisoners from Faringdon to Whitchurch, Hampshire. The regiment was scheduled to move to Kent in April 1761, but this was cancelled. It left Buckinghamshire in March 1762 and went to Winchester where a large militia camp had been established. The main duty was guarding prisoners of war. In May 1762 a group of 24 Frenchmen held in the King's House got out through a large drain when the Bucks Militia under John Wilkes was on duty. They were spotted by a vigilant sentry who challenged and then fired on them, alerting the other guards. In the scuffle two prisoners were wounded and only four got away into the fields where they were subsequently hunted down by the Buckinghamshires.

In 1762 Sir Francis Dashwood (now Lord le Despencer) resigned from the colonelcy on becoming Chancellor of the Exchequer and recommended that Wilkes should be promoted in his place despite Wilkes's increasing notoriety as a Radical MP and member of Dashwood's Hellfire Club. The militia was disembodied in December 1762 ahead of the signature of the Treaty of Paris and the men were sent to their homes after Col Wilkes paid for a 'farewell drink' for them at Reading, which lasted for three days. Wilkes's peacetime term of command was brief: in April 1763 he was arrested for an article he had published attacking the government. The Lord-Lieutenant, Richard Grenville-Temple, 2nd Earl Temple, was instructed by his brother George Grenville, former captain in the Bucks Militia and now Prime Minister, to dismiss Wilkes from the regiment. He was also accused of fraud in the regimental accounts.

Further legislation kept the militia in being, and it carried out its annual training. In June 1769 there was an anti-Militia riot at Wing, Buckinghamshire, when a 300-strong mob prevented the ballot being held for Cottesloe Hundred.

=== American War of Independence ===
The militia was mobilised in 1778 during the War of American Independence when the country was threatened with invasion by the Americans' allies, France and Spain. The Buckinghamshires, now commanded by Col Coulson Skottowe and Lt-Col Lovell Badcock, were embodied on 26 March and in May went to Portsmouth, where together with the Huntingdonshires they were put to constructing fortifications. The officers of the two regiments complained that this work was demeaning for a citizen force intended for use only in emergencies. However, militiamen engaged in skilled work were paid extra, and the real objection seems to have been the extra work for the officers. In 1779 militia regiments were permitted to recruit additional companies by voluntary enlistment, and the Bucks Militia formed its company at Aylesbury in June.

The Buckinghamshires went back into winter quarters at High Wycombe and Amersham in November 1778, and then in the summer of 1779 they were at Coxheath Camp near Maidstone in Kent.This was the army's largest training camp, where the Militia were exercised as part of a division alongside Regular troops while providing a reserve in case of French invasion of South East England. That winter was spent quartered at Chipping Norton and Woodstock, Oxfordshire.

Again, in May 1780 the regiment formed part of a brigade under Lieutenant-General Simon Fraser in a training camp at Waterdown Forest, near Tunbridge Wells in Kent. However, in June the regiment was sent to the London area during the Gordon Riots: five companies went to guard Deptford Dockyard and the other five to Woolwich Dockyard. (Their former colonel John Wilkes took command of other militia detachments guarding the Bank of England and ordered them to fire on the rioters.)

In 1780 Dashwood (now Lord Le Despenser and Lord-Lieutenant of Buckinghamshire) could not decide whether to give the colonelcy to the Earl of Chesterfield, a political friend, or to the 3rd Earl Temple, who was a better officer. He chose Temple, who was commissioned on 7 November 1780 and later became lord-lieutenant himself; he was created Marquess of Buckingham in 1784.

The regiment wintered in Kent and Sussex, and then returned to Portsmouth and Southsea in May 1781. That year's inspection showed that due to wartime shortages the regiment's weapons had been in use for 16 years instead of the recommended 12. It moved back to Buckingham in October 1781, and was at Portsmouth and Southsea again in June 1782. It then wintered at Winchester. By the summer of 1783 a peace treaty was being negotiated, and the militia was disembodied; the Buckinghamshires were sent home to Amersham and Chesham for the purpose in July.

From 1784 to 1792 the militia were supposed to assemble for 28 days' annual training, even though to save money only two-thirds of the men were actually called out each year. In 1786 the number of permanent non-commissioned officers (NCOs) was reduced.

=== French Revolutionary War ===
The militia had already been embodied in December 1792 (Buckinghamshire on 5 December) as a precautionary measure before Revolutionary France declared war on Britain on 1 February 1793. The fact that only two-thirds of the men had been trained and additional NCOs had to be obtained impeded the mobilisation and efficiency of the regiment, and it was delayed in departing for its war station at Portsmouth. However, by March 1793 it was only 30 men short of establishment.

The French Revolutionary Wars saw a new phase for the English militia: they were embodied for a whole generation, and became regiments of full-time professional soldiers (though restricted to service in the British Isles), which the regular army increasingly saw as a prime source of recruits. They served in coast defences, manned garrisons, guarded prisoners of war, and performed internal security duties, while their traditional local defence duties were taken over by the Volunteers and mounted Yeomanry.

By April 1793 the Buckinghamshires were stationed at Winchester, guarding prisoners of war as before – in June four companies escorted 1000 French prisoners from Salisbury to Warminster – and in August had seven companies at Winchester and one detached to Bishop's Waltham. By 24 September at Winchester it had formed an artillery detachment with two brass 6-pounder guns and a Royal Artillery instructor. As well as these two 'government guns', the county also funded two more guns acquired from the government founder at Woolwich Arsenal and assigned 40 additional men to man them. (Note: These engraved 'county guns' were bought from the 1921 Stowe House sale by Fort Ticonderoga in New York State.) Lieutenant-Col Badcock resigned in January 1794 on grounds of ill-health. He was succeeded by Henry Tompkins, with the Earl of Chesterfield as temporary second Lt-Col, and John Fremantle, a former Regular officer, as major. However, Tompkins died in November and Chesterfield resigned, so Benjamin Way, MP, became Lt-Col and effective commanding officer.

== Royal Buckinghamshire Militia (King's Own) ==
In 1794 the regiment was stationed at Weymouth, Dorset, when King George III was in residence. It formed his personal guard during the visit and this was not mere ceremony: the king was 'unruly' in ignoring simple security precautions, and the regiment had to have 102 men constantly on duty by day, and 152 on patrol and sentry duty by night. There were also French prisoners in the town to be guarded, and the regiment's numbers were depleted by sickness. At the end of this deployment the king granted the regiment the title of Royal Buckinghamshire Militia (King's Own) (often shortened to the 'Royal Bucks').

The Royal Bucks were dissatisfied at being stationed at Portsmouth in 1795–6, where the townsfolk were antagonistic, and the regiment had to deal with food riots. The Marquess of Buckingham complained when it was proposed to move them to similar quarters at Bristol in October 1796. On 26 February 1797, five companies of the regiment, with their two guns paraded on College Green at Bristol with the 13th Foot and the Suffolk Fencible Cavalry to face a French invasion force. This had been blown off course on its way to Bristol and the troops had been landed at Fishguard in Pembrokeshire. Local Bristol merchants supplied waggons to take the troops and their baggage to Pill on the River Avon where they were to board small boats to Tenby, while the local Bristol Volunteers took over guarding the French prisoners. The force was just about to embark when news came that the invasion force had already surrendered. The Royal Bucks remained at Bristol until October 1797, when they marched to Chelmsford in Essex for the winter.

=== Supplementary Militia ===
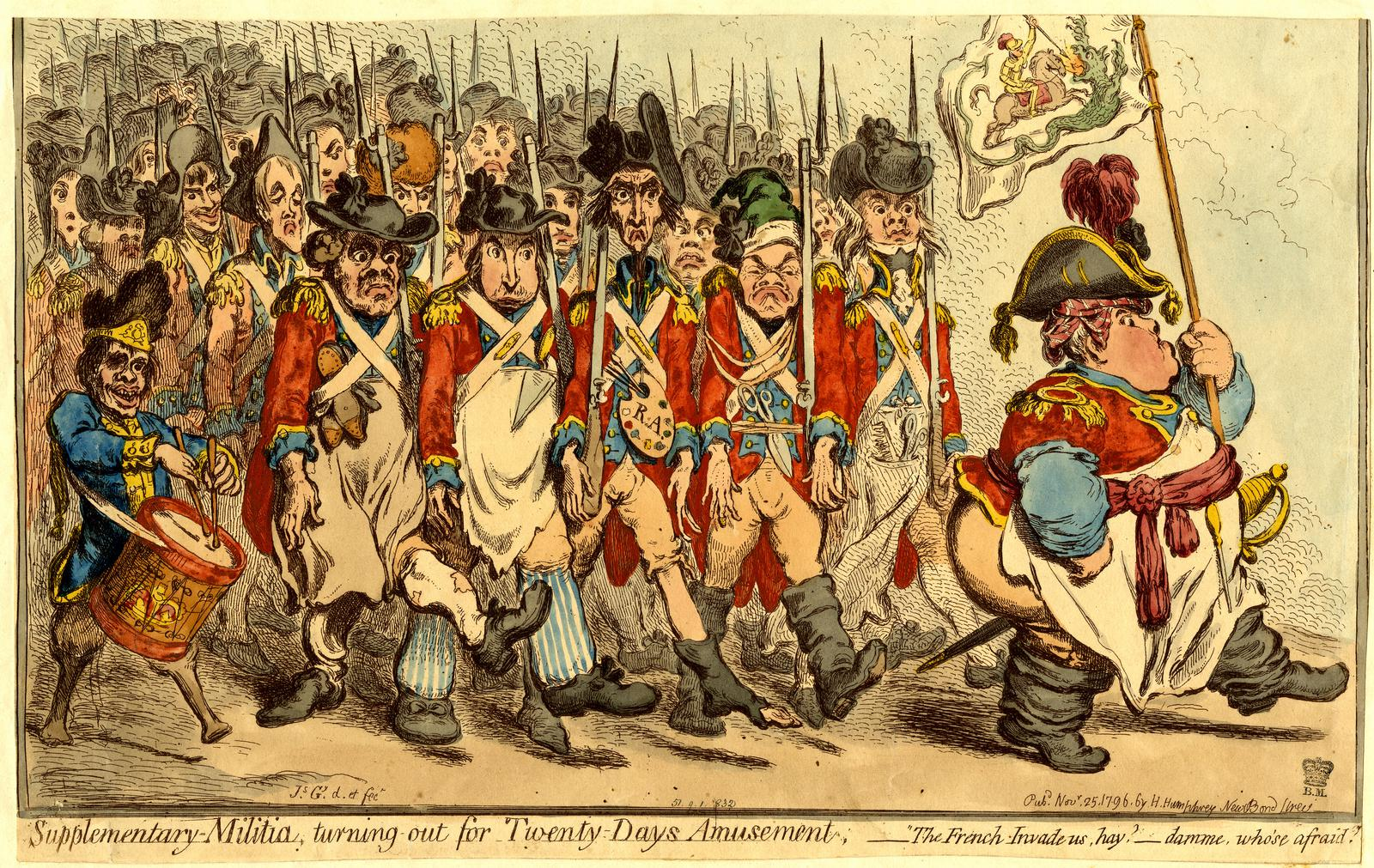
Supplementary-Militia, turning-out for Twenty Days Amusement: 1796 caricature by James Gillray.

In an attempt to have as many men as possible under arms for home defence in order to release regulars, the Government created the Supplementary Militia in 1796, a compulsory levy of men to be trained in their spare time, and to be incorporated in the militia in emergency. Buckinghamshire's additional quota was set at 662. The lieutenancies were required to carry out 20 days' initial training as soon as possible, which was done by drill teams provided by the regular county militia. There was considerable opposition across the country to this conscription, with numerous ballot riots, including one at Wing on 12 December 1796, where the lieutenancy meeting was disrupted and the ballot list for Cottesloe Hundred was destroyed. Ringleaders were arrested and ensuing meetings went ahead under the protection of the Buckinghamshire Yeomanry. The Marquess of Buckingham offered to raise the whole Buckinghamshire quota by means of voluntary enlistment, saying that some militia officers he had consulted said that it could not be done in any other way. Although the government decided that this would be illegal and the ballot had to be employed, Buckingham was able to replace all the county's subsequent vacancies with volunteers mainly at his own expense, and after 1798 the whole ballot system fell into disuse in Buckinghamshire.

=== Irish Rebellion ===
The Irish Rebellion broke out in May 1798, and the Marquess of Buckingham and his officers suggested legislation to allow the English Militia to serve there. This was rejected, but in the summer the rebellion became more serious, with the French sending help to the rebels. Once the necessary legislation was passed the Royal Bucks was the first regiment that volunteered to serve in Ireland. On 20 June the main body of the regiment including its guns went by waggon from Chelmsford to the Grand Junction Canal at Blisworth in Northamptonshire, and thence by 18 canal boats boats to Liverpool for embarkation. They arrived at Dublin on 2 July, followed by the Warwickshires, the first of 13 English militia regiments to serve in Ireland. Both were commanded by their respective colonels, the Marquesses of Buckingham and Hertford. When General Humbert's French force landed in late August the Commander-in-Chief, Marquess Cornwallis marched out with a large force, including part of the Royal Bucks under Maj Fremantle. However, the Marquess of Buckingham was left at Dublin and blamed Hertford for this humiliation. The Royal Bucks detachment was present at the Battle of Ballinamuck when Cornwallis's overwhelming forces compelled the surrender of Humbert's Franco-Irish army on 8 September, but their participation was limited to securing prisoners. A further 200 Bucks militiamen marched from Chelmsford to Liverpool in September and joined their comrades in Ireland. Thereafter the Royal Bucks carried out routine duties around Dublin: guarding the Castle, posting detachments at Kilmainham and Newgate Gaols, and various outposts. Cornwallis considered the militia's battalion guns as a hindrance when chasing rebels, and withdrew the government guns from the regiments to be stored at Dublin Castle and manned by the Royal Artillery; the Royal Bucks however, retained their own two 'county' guns. The regiment soon became disenchanted with Dublin: two of its men were murdered and fever broke out. At the end of the year the militia regiments were asked if they would extend their service in Ireland, but with the crisis over they were not enthusiastic to do so. The first regiments to arrive, the Buckinghamshires and Warwickshires, were the most eager to go home. The Marquess of Buckingham blamed the Marquess of Hertford for this situation: 'Lord Hertford has allowed the Warwick to run riot and they tainted ours till they found me more sturdy than his lordship'. Buckingham persuaded his regiment to stay on until April 1799, the men apologising for their behaviour in insulting their colours, their guns, and their colonel. The Warwicks were eventually brought into line as well. The Royal Bucks returned to England in April 1799 and after a welcome dinner at Buckingham resumed their routine duties at Chelmsford, also helping farmers with their harvest.

The supplementary militia had been called out in two halves in February and August 1798 to augment the regular militia (possibly accounting for the 200 reinforcements sent to the Royal Bucks in Ireland). However, they were stood down again in 1799 and the government encouraged the disembodied supplementaries to transfer to the Regular Army for a bounty. The Marquess of Buckingham was content for this to happen, as long as militia officers were not made redundant by the reduction (many in fact gained Regular commissions by inducing groups of their men to transfer en bloc) and that the militia should be able to recruit replacements by 'beat of drum' like the Regulars – men who might later transfer in turn. In July 1799 the regiment supplied 693 men: 285 (and eventually 9 officers and 329 other ranks) to the 4th Foot, 26 to the Royal Artillery, 16 to the 16th Foot and 232 to the 56th Foot. Many of these men were NCOs, drummers, or from the Grenadier and Light companies, and almost all were volunteers or substitutes rather than balloted men. Thereafter the Royal Bucks supplied its quota of men to the Regular army each year, usually to the 14th (Buckinghamshire) Regiment of Foot.

The Royal Bucks wintered at Buckingham from November 1799, returning to Chelmsford in May the following year. In November 1800 it was posted to Norman Cross Prison, the biggest prisoner of war camp in England. In August 1801 the regiment moved to Colchester, where it was on high alert, even though peace talks were under way. It wintered at Chelmsford until hostilities ended with the Treaty of Amiens in 1802. The regiment returned to Buckingham and Aylesbury to be disembodied in April 1802. Peacetime militia training was reduced to 21 days per year, and Buckinghamshire's quota reduced to 599.

=== Napoleonic Wars ===
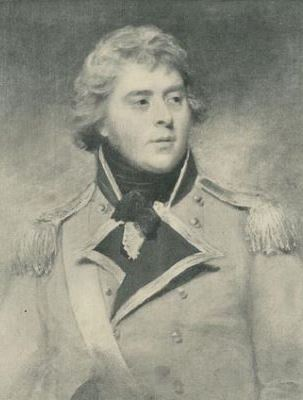
George Romney's portrait of Earl Temple, before he succeeded as 2nd Marquess of Buckingham.

The Peace of Amiens was short-lived and the militia was re-embodied on 11 March 1803, with training immediately raised to 28 days and the supplementaries also called out on 28 May. The Royal Bucks immediately went to Colchester, and then moved on to Harwich Barracks in June.

In declining health the Marquess of Buckingham stood down from the command of the Royal Bucks Militia, and as lord lieutenant he appointed his eldest son, Richard, Earl Temple, as colonel on 11 October 1803. (Buckingham remained colonel of the three regiments of Buckinghamshire Yeomanry and their three associated regiments of Volunteers.)

In June 1804 the regiment returned to Colchester, then went to Coxheath Camp in August, before going into winter quarters in nearby Maidstone in December. While at Coxheath and Maidstone detachments manned warning beacons on Barham Downs and Boxley Hill. During the summer of 1805, when Napoleon was massing his 'Army of England' at Boulogne for a projected invasion, the regiment (541 men in 10 Companies under Lt-Col Way) was at Chelmsford Barracks, which it shared with the East Kent Militia in Maj-Gen Duncan Campbell's brigade. Again, detachments manned signal stations.

The Royal Bucks spent the winter of 1805–06 quartered in Essex, first at Colchester, then at Weeley Barracks, and then at Brentwood. In April 1806 it marched to Devonshire, being stationed at Ottery St Mary until March 1807, when it shifted to Exeter, providing prisoner escorts, with a brief stay at Crediton. In October the regiment marched to Sussex, where it was quartered at Horsham Barracks, then Eastbourne Barracks from February 1808. It was at Dover from June 1809, mounting guards at the Castle, the Citadel, the Western Heights and other posts. It returned to Colchester in December 1811, and was at Woodbridge, Suffolk, in January 1812.

Major Sir William Young, 2nd Baronet, MP for Buckingham, was promoted to Lt-Col of the Royal Bucks in 1807, but was often away on Parliamentary business.

In 1808 and again in 1810 Earl Temple volunteered the Royal Bucks to serve in the Peninsular War, but the government did not accept these offers.

=== Local Militia ===
While the Regular Militia were the mainstay of national defence during the Napoleonic Wars, they were supplemented from 1808 by the Local Militia, which were part-time and only to be used within their own districts. These were raised to counter the declining numbers of Volunteers, and if their ranks could not be filled voluntarily the militia ballot was employed. They were to be trained once a year. The Local Militia quota for Buckinghamshire was six times the 1802 militia quota. In 1805 there had been three infantry volunteer corps in the county, each associated with one of the yeomanry regiments in a 'Legion':

- 1st (Southern) Regiment
- 2nd (Middle) Regiment:
  - Aylesbury Hundred
  - Buckingham Hundred
  - Cottesloe Hundred
- 3rd (Northern) Regiment: Newport Hundred

These infantry units simply transferred to the Local Militia under the same titles. The new commanders were Strickland Freeman of Fawley Court, William Greville Pigott of Doddershall, formerly of the Royal Bucks Militia, and the Hon Vere Poulett, formerly Lt-Col Commandant of the 2nd Bucks Volunteers. The Marquess of Buckingham had been colonel of all three Volunteer Corps (as he was of the three equivalent regiments of Yeomanry), but as Lord-Lieutenant he could not hold more than one militia colonelcy, and therefore had to give them up when they transferred to the Local Militia. All of the northern regiment and two thirds of the others accepted the offered bounty and transferred to the Local Militia, but this only amounted to 894 men and an additional 1429 had to be found from volunteers and balloted men. Buckingham formed two Light Companies in each regiment rather than a Light Company and a Grenadier Company. Training was carried out in May each year to fit the farming cycle.

=== Northern England and Ireland ===
Increasingly militia duties included internal security in the industrial areas of Northern England where there was considerable unrest. In February 1812 the regiment moved to Nottingham, the focus of Luddite activity, where a 3000-strong force was deployed. From April it was stationed in Manchester (7 companies) and Stockport (3 companies), with detachments sent to Oldham, Bury, Bolton and Rochdale as required. The regiment's artillery was useful in shows of force. It moved to Newcastle upon Tyne in October. In February 1813 the Marquess of Buckingham died and Earl Temple succeeded his father as 2nd Marquess and as Lord-Lieutenant of Buckinghamshire. He retained the colonelcy of the Royal Bucks Militia. In 1813 The English Militia were invited to exchange with Irish Militia regiments on a voluntary basis, and the Royal Bucks did so, serving in Ireland from June 1813. It was stationed at Athlone and Carrick.

=== 1st Provisional Battalion ===
In November 1813 the militia were invited to volunteer for limited overseas service, primarily for garrison duties in Europe. Volunteers from the Royal Bucks (21 officers and 560 other ranks) formed the bulk of the 1st Provisional Battalion, commanded by the 2nd Marquess of Buckingham as Lt-Col Commandant, with Lt-Col Sir William Young of the Royal Bucks as his second-in-command, and two Regular Army captains as majors. With two other provisional battalions it formed a Militia Brigade commanded by Maj-Gen Sir Henry Bayley. The Royal Bucks contingent sailed from Ireland and went to Haslar Barracks, Gosport, where it was later joined by the other constituents of 1st Provisional Bn. The brigade embarked at Portsmouth Harbour on 10–14 March 1814 and sailed to join the Earl of Dalhousie's division that had occupied Bordeaux just as the war was ending. The brigade did not form part of the Army of Occupation after the abdication of Napoleon and returned to England in June. On leaving France at the end of the deployment, the officers of the Royal Bucks were decorated with the Order of the Fleur de Lys by the restored King Louis XVIII of France. 1st Provisional Bn sailed on 6 June and disembarked at Plymouth.

After their return from overseas service the detachments of the Royal Bucks concentrated at Portsmouth in October 1814. It was there at Fort Cumberland in March 1815, awaiting disembodiment, when Napoleon escaped from Elba, initiating the short Waterloo Campaign. The Royal Bucks Militia was finally disembodied at Buckingham in January 1816. The Local Militia was stood down in 1816 and their ballot was suspended.

=== Long peace ===
Although officers continued to be commissioned into the militia and ballots were still held during the long peace after Waterloo, the regiments were rarely assembled for training (1820, 1821, 1825 and 1831, the Royal Bucks usually quartered around Buckingham and training at the Duke of Buckingham's park at Stowe) and the permanent staffs of sergeants and drummers were progressively reduced. The ballot was suspended by the Militia Act 1829. In 1825 Capt Charles Grove of the 14th Foot was appointed adjutant to command the permanent staff of the Royal Bucks. He had originally served in the regiment from 1807 to 1812, when he was one of those officers who led a draft of recruits to the 14th Foot and was rewarded with a Regular commission. He had seen active service in the Mediterranean and with the Army of Occupation in France after Waterloo. Lieutenant-Col George Pigott, who replaced Sir William Young in 1836, had also served with the 14th Foot from 1812 to 1817. The Marquess of Buckingham (who became 1st Duke of Buckingham and Chandos in 1822) continued in command of the Royal Bucks until his death in 1839. It was assumed that his son the Marquess of Chandos would succeed him, but the government appointed Robert Carrington, 2nd Baron Carrington as both colonel and lord-lieutenant. Carrington immediately transferred the staff and battalion headquarters to his own house at Wycombe Abbey, where the stable yard formed the battalion offices. In 1852 Carrington forced out Lt-Col Pigott claiming that service in the militia was incompatible with his role as a Poor Law Inspector. At that time six of the remaining officers had seen service with the 1st Provisional Bn in 1813–14. Any activity by the militia at this period was by the permanent staff and the band. When Queen Victoria visited Stowe House in 1845, the staff of the Royal Bucks, with their Regimental colours, formed a guard of honour at Wolverton railway station.

== 1852 reforms ==
The Militia was revived by the Militia Act 1852, enacted during a period of international tension. As before, units were raised and administered on a county basis, and filled by voluntary enlistment (although conscription by means of the militia ballot might be used if the counties failed to meet their quotas). Training was for 56 days on enlistment, then for 21–28 days per year, during which the men received full army pay. Under the Act, militia units could be embodied by Royal Proclamation for full-time home defence service in three circumstances:

1. 'Whenever a state of war exists between Her Majesty and any foreign power'.
2. 'In all cases of invasion or upon imminent danger thereof'.
3. 'In all cases of rebellion or insurrection'.

The existing militia regiments were reorganised, with most of the old officers and permanent staff pensioned off and replaced by younger officers, many of the former Regulars. In the Royal Bucks only Lord Carrington remained as colonel and Capt Grove as paymaster (and they remained well into the 1860s). The position of colonel was abolished for the future and the lieutenant-colonel became the commanding officer (CO): George FitzRoy was commissioned as Lt-Col in the Royal Bucks on 29 October 1852, replaced by Walter Pratt (formerly of the 67th Foot) promoted on 23 April 1855.

Lord Carrington insisted that all recruits to the Royal Bucks should have their police records checked, and he interviewed each man personally, giving then 3 shillings in addition to the government bounty. He also supplemented the government's clothing allowance to get better quality cloth for the men's uniforms. Buckinghamshire was the first county to complete its first year quota, in just two months, 90 per cent of the recruits being agricultural workers.

=== Crimean War ===
War having broken out with Russia in 1854 and an expeditionary force sent to the Crimea, the militia were called out for home defence. The Royal Bucks was one of the first regiments embodied, on 15 June, and immediately set off to relieve a regular regiment at Weedon Barracks in Northamptonshire. Carrington rode at the head of the regiment to Aylesbury (giving the band boys rides on the way) where it entrained for Weedon.

The barracks at Weedon were in poor repair. In November the regiment shifted to Windsor, Berkshire, before moving on to Canterbury in January 1855. Large numbers of militiamen from the Royal Bucks volunteered to transfer to the army during the winter: 80 to the Grenadier Guards, 20 to the Royal Artillery, and 60 to other regiments during the winter, but the regiment obtained 101 new recruits. The regiment moved to Woolwich in May 1855, and from November was stationed at the Tower of London. A total of 143 men volunteered for the regulars in December alone. (Note: A number of militia regiments volunteered for overseas garrison duty, and in December and January the Gazette shows the Royal Bucks stationed in the Ionian Islands, leaving a depot at the Tower. However, if orders for this move were issued they were soon cancelled and the regiment remained in the UK.) By February 1856 it was distributed between Hugh Wycombe, Cardigan, and Aberystwyth. Peace was concluded with the Treaty of Paris in March 1856 and the regiment was disembodied.

Thereafter the regiment was called out for its annual training. It was not one of the regiments embodied for home service during the Indian Mutiny. Militia battalions now had a large cadre of permanent staff (about 30) and a number of the officers were former Regulars. Around a third of the recruits and many young officers went on to join the Regular Army. New officers in the Royal Bucks at this period include the Hon Charles Carrington, the colonel's eldest son, who had been a cornet in the Royal Horse Guards, and Alfred de Rothschild, the banker and heir to a large Buckinghamshire estate, both commissioned in 1863. The Militia Reserve introduced in 1867 consisted of present and former militiamen who undertook to serve overseas in case of war.

Colonel Lord Carrington died in 1868, and was succeeded in command by Lt-Col Walter Pratt. The 3rd Duke of Buckingham, who succeeded Carrington as lord lieutenant, negotiated to return the battalion HQ from Wycombe Abbey to Buckingham, but it remained at High Wycombe.

== Cardwell and Childers reforms ==
Under the 'Localisation of the Forces' scheme introduced by the Cardwell Reforms of 1872, militia regiments were brigaded with their local Regular and Volunteer battalions. For the Royal Bucks Militia this was in Sub-District No 42 (Counties of Oxfordshire & Bucks):

- 52nd (Oxfordshire) Light Infantry
- 85th Regiment of Foot (Bucks Volunteers)
- Royal Buckinghamshire Militia at High Wycombe
- Oxfordshire Militia at Oxford
- 1st (Oxford University) Oxfordshire Rifle Volunteer Corps at Oxford
- 1st Administrative Battalion, Oxfordshire Rifle Volunteer Corps (later 2nd Oxfordshire RVC) at Oxford
- 1st Administrative Battalion, Buckinghamshire Rifle Volunteer Corps at Great Marlow

The Militia now came under the War Office rather than their county lords lieutenant.

Cowley Barracks was built in 1876 as the brigade depot at Bullingdon Green, Oxford, but the Royal Bucks retained their HQ at High Wycombe.

Although often referred to as brigades, the sub-districts were purely administrative organisations, but in a continuation of the Cardwell Reforms a mobilisation scheme began to appear in the Army List from December 1875. This assigned Regular and Militia units to places in an order of battle of corps, divisions and brigades for the 'Active Army', even though these formations were entirely theoretical, with no staff or services assigned. The Royal Bucks Militia were assigned as 'divisional troops' at Gloucester to 3rd Division of V Corps. The division did actually undertake collective training at Minchinhampton Common in 1876 during the international crisis that led to the Russo-Turkish War; the Militia Reserve were also called out during this crisis, 172 men of the Royal Bucks being temporarily called up to the depot at Oxford.

Over the following years (except in 1870–71 and 1886 when it was cancelled due to smallpox epidemics) the battalion carried out its training either in Buckinghamshire (High Wycombe or Aylesbury) or with the army at Aldershot or Salisbury Plain. The link with the 52nd Foot was strengthened in 1880, when the regiment was training at Aldershot and provided a large draft of volunteers for the regular battalion.

Lieutenant-Col Pratt retired from the command and became the regiment's first Honorary Colonel in December 1880. Major Charles Carrington, now 3rd Lord Carrington, was promoted to Lt-Col and took command on 4 May 1881.

== 3rd Battalion (Royal Bucks Militia), Oxfordshire Light Infantry ==
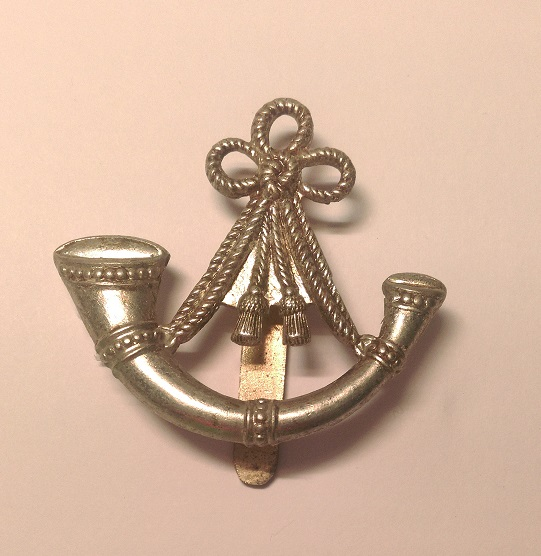
The stringed bugle-horn cap badge of the Oxfordshire Light Infantry.

The Childers Reforms of 1881 completed the Cardwell process by converting the Regular regiments into two-battalion county regiments, each with two militia battalions. The 'Ox & Bucks' link between the 52nd and 85th Foot was broken: instead the 43rd (Monmouthshire) Light Infantry became the 1st Battalion, the 52nd the 2nd Battalion of the new Oxfordshire Light Infantry (OLI). The Royal Bucks Militia became the 3rd (Royal Bucks Militia) Battalion and the Oxfordshires became the 4th (Oxford Militia) Battalion. The 3rd Battalion objected to using the 'Oxfordshire' title, and after much lobbying its HQ remained at High Wycombe. A new barracks and staff cottages were built on Laokes Hill and opened in 1884

Lord Carrington stepped down as CO after he was appointed Governor of New South Wales in 1885, and Major Edward Lee of Hartwell House was promoted to succeed him. Carrington resumed command when he returned to the UK in 1890. Lieutenant-Col H. Burney then took over the command in April 1897, but in little over a year he handed over to Edmond FitzMaurice, 7th Earl of Orkney. Instead of a retired regular officer, the battalion's adjutant was now usually a younger officer from the parent regiment, appointed for a five-year term. Captain John Hanbury-Williams held the position 1892–97.

=== Second Boer War ===
At the outbreak of the Second Boer War in 1899 the Militia Reserve was mobilised on 7 October, just before the Boers invaded Cape Colony and Natal, and during November a few militia battalions were embodied to release regulars for service in South Africa. But after the disasters of Black Week at the start of December 1899, most of the Regular Army was sent to South Africa, and many more militia units were embodied to replace them for home defence. The 3rd OLI was embodied at High Wycombe under the command of the Earl of Orkney on 17 January 1900 and proceeded to Milford Haven for transport to Cork in Ireland. It was stationed first at Buttevant, where there was a large militia concentration, and then from May under canvas for musketry training at Kilworth Camp near Mallow. The camp was wrecked by a storm on 4 October, so the battalion returned next day to Buttevant. During its period of service the battalion had the home details of the OLI attached, and it sent several drafts of recovered invalids and a total of 184 militia volunteers to the 1st Battalion serving in South Africa. The battalion left Buttevant for England on 31 October and was disembodied next day at High Wycombe. Thereafter a number of militiamen volunteered to serve with the regulars as the war continued.

Buckinghamshire farmers had suffered a labour shortage while the battalion was on service, and it was thought that the battalion would not be called out for annual training in 1901. However, they were told that it was likely to be summoned to Aldershot between 15 June and 31 August – at harvest time – and there was more unhappiness when training at Churn Down in 1902 was brought forward from 15 July to 9 June, and again at Bisley the following year. By 1902 the strength of the battalion had fallen from its peak of 800 in the 1880s to barely 400, and employers were not supportive.

=== Disbandment ===
After the Boer War, the future of the Militia was called into question. There were moves to reform the Auxiliary Forces (Militia, Yeomanry and Volunteers) to take their place in the six Army Corps proposed by the Secretary of State for War, St John Brodrick. However, little of Brodrick's scheme was carried out. Under the more sweeping Haldane Reforms of 1908, the Militia was replaced by the Special Reserve (SR), a semi-professional force whose role was to provide reinforcement drafts for Regular units serving overseas in wartime, rather like the earlier Militia Reserve. The weak 3rd Battalion OLI was not included in this scheme. It was disbanded on 31 July 1908; although 243 of its 560 men transferred to SR with the former 4th (Oxfordshire Militia) Bn, which became the new 3rd (Reserve) Battalion, the remainder took their discharge or served out their time as militiamen. The parent regiment did however change its title to Oxfordshire and Buckinghamshire Light Infantry.

== Heritage & ceremonial ==
=== Uniforms & Insignia ===
The traditional badge of Buckinghamshire, adopted for the early colours and drums of the regiment.

In 1778 the regiment's uniforms were red with black facings; in 1793 the facings were yellow. Unusually the drummers and musicians also wore red coats faced yellow rather than the reverse as in most regiments, though the drum-major did wear yellow faced red. The artillery detachment wore the normal uniform but with only one cross-belt (the bayonet belt); their Royal Artillery instructor wore his RA blue uniform. The yellow regimental colour bore the traditional badge of Buckinghamshire: a shield divided vertically into red and black, bearing a chained white swan, and the yellow (or brass) drums also had the swan. A black bicorne hat was worn except by the grenadiers, who had black leather fronted caps with gilt mountings (their officers wore a bearskin), and the drummers who fur caps. The band included two black musicians who wore decorated jackets, red boots, and special headgear: the tambourine player had a black stove-pipe Shako with a brass front, the cymbal-player wore a turban. In 1794 the regiment changed to the blue facings appropriate to a Royal regiment. It retained these until 1881, when it adopted the white facings of the OLI.

Two different crossbelt plates are recorded for the regiment in 1793: one was silver and carried the badge of the swan, the other was gilt or brass with a six-rayed star. The officers' gorget carried the Royal Arms on a blue enamel background. The buttons of 1800 bore the Royal cypher inside a garter surmounted by a crown, the garter bearing the motto Honi soit qui ma y pense; a circle round the edge of the button was inscribed 'Royal Bucks. King's Own Militia'. Later the design on the buttons was a Lion of England within a crowned circle bearing the name of the regiment. The shako plate of the 1830 period had a silver star mounted on a large crowned star, in the centre the lion within a garter inscribed 'The King's Own Militia', with 'Royal Bucks' on a scroll below. The design on the officers' shoulder-belt plate was similar. The lion badge was retained until 1881.

The three Volunteer Corps wore green uniforms like their associated Yeomanry Regiments, but their successor Local Militia would have been clothed in red.

Four militia regiments were granted the Irish Harp as an emblem on their colours for their distinguished service in Ireland in 1798–9, but the Royal Bucks was not among them, despite being the first regiment to arrive there.

The 1st Provisional Militia Bn of 1814 wore red coats with blue facings. Their regimental colour was dark blue with the words '1st Provisional Battalion' surrounded by a wreath of roses. After the battalion's disbandment its colours were laid up in the private chapel at the Marquess of Buckingham's Stowe House. After the Royal Bucks officers of this battalion were decorated with the fleur-de-lys by Louis XVIII in 1814, the regiment incorporated that device in the drummers' lace until 1866.

On the disbandment of the 3rd (Royal Bucks Militia) Bn, its colours were laid up in High Wycombe Parish Church.

=== Precedence ===
In September 1759 it was ordered that militia regiments on service were to take precedence from the date of their arrival in camp. In 1760 this was altered to a system of drawing lots where regiments did duty together. During the War of American Independence the counties were given an order of precedence determined by ballot each year. For Buckinghamshire the positions were:

- 10th on 1 June 1778
- 40th on 12 May 1779
- 45th on 6 May 1780
- 20th on 28 April 1781
- 2nd on 7 May 1782

The militia order of precedence balloted for in 1793 (Buckinghamshire was 38th) remained in force throughout the French Revolutionary War. Another ballot for precedence took place in 1803 at the start of the Napoleonic War, when Buckinghamshire was 49th. This order continued until 1833. In that year the King drew the lots for individual regiments and the resulting list remained in force with minor amendments until the end of the militia. The regiments raised before the peace of 1763 took the first 47 places; the Royal Bucks was placed at 35th, and this was retained when the list was revised in 1855. Most militia regiments ignored the numeral.

=== Commanders ===
Commanding officers of the regiment included:

Colonels

- Sir Richard Temple, 3rd Baronet
- William Cheyne, MP
- Sir Thomas Lee, 3rd Baronet, MP, commissioned 1715
- John Wilkes, MP
- George Nugent-Temple-Grenville, 1st Marquess of Buckingham
- Richard Temple-Nugent-Brydges-Chandos-Grenville, 1st Duke of Buckingham and Chandos, appointed 11 October 1803
- Robert Carrington, 2nd Baron Carrington, died 17 March 1868
- Walter Pratt 1868
- Charles Wynn-Carington, 1st Marquess of Lincolnshire 1881–86

Honorary Colonels

- Walter Pratt, former CO, 8 December 1880
- Edward Lee, former CO, 4 August 1900

== See also ==
- Trained bands
- Militia (England)
- Militia (Great Britain)
- Militia (United Kingdom)
- Oxfordshire Militia
- Oxfordshire Light Infantry
