= Alan Ayot =

English politician

Alan Ayot (died c. 1416) was an English politician. He sat as MP for Buckinghamshire in April 1384 and 1393.

== Family ==
He was probably the son of Laurence Ayot and his wife Marion. Before March 1363, he married Agnes, the widow of Thomas de la Hay (died c. 1362) and had one son (who probably predeceased him) and one daughter.

In 1363, he acquired stronger control over the manor of West Wickham through his wife's inheritance from her former husband, Thomas de la Hay. He paid £10 relief to the Countess of Oxford for two knights' fees connected with the property.

Before 1377, he succeeded his father, Laurence Ayot and inherited the manor of Shalstone in Buckinghamshire.

== Life ==
In Easter 1375, with Roger Dayrell, he acted as surety for a defendant at the assizes held at Edlesborough. In 1377, he was named by Roger Dayrell as a trustee of the manor of Hamworth in Middlesex. In 1379, he witnessed a conveyance for Sir John Kentwood. In Februar 1386, he became party to a bond worth £160 payable to the Abbot of Westminster.

In 1389, he was arrested with other residents of Shalstone for making threats against the monks of Luffield Priory, he was released on bail and apparently escaped further punishment. In 1390, he was appointed trustee of the manor of Hinton near Brackley on behalf of William Doyly, beginning a long involvement in the Doyly-Lovell property dispute.

In early 1400, he twice acted with lawyer John Barton as a Chancery surety for defendants in lawsuits. In April 1400, he was guaranteed, under a penalty of 500 marks that Leonard Mallory would provide security for appearing before the King's Council if released from the Tower.

In 1399 and 1401, the Doylys petitioned Parliament against John Lovell, Lord Lovell over the seizure of Hinton manor. In 1406, he was chosen as one of six arbitrators in the Hinton dispute. Only him and Thomas Chaucer attended the scheduled Chancery hearing. In January 1407, he failed to appear at a further arbitration session and had to be urgently summoned to London. After arbitration failed, the Doylys again petitioned Parliament.

== Death ==
In 1415, probably following the death of his son Alan Ayot junior, he transferred Foscott manor to John Barton I and John Barton II in exchange for a pension of 8 marks annually. He secured a life annuity of 20 marks from Shalstone, He arranged for Shalstone to pass after his death to his daughter, Marion Purefoy and her husband William Purefoy. He died within three years of the 1415 settlement. His death triggered disputes over ownership of Foscott between his widowed daughter-in-law and her new husband, John Dayrell, the Purefoy family and the Barton family (who intended to grant the manor to a college at Oxford).
