= John Fortescue of Salden =

16th-century English politician and Chancellor of the Exchequer

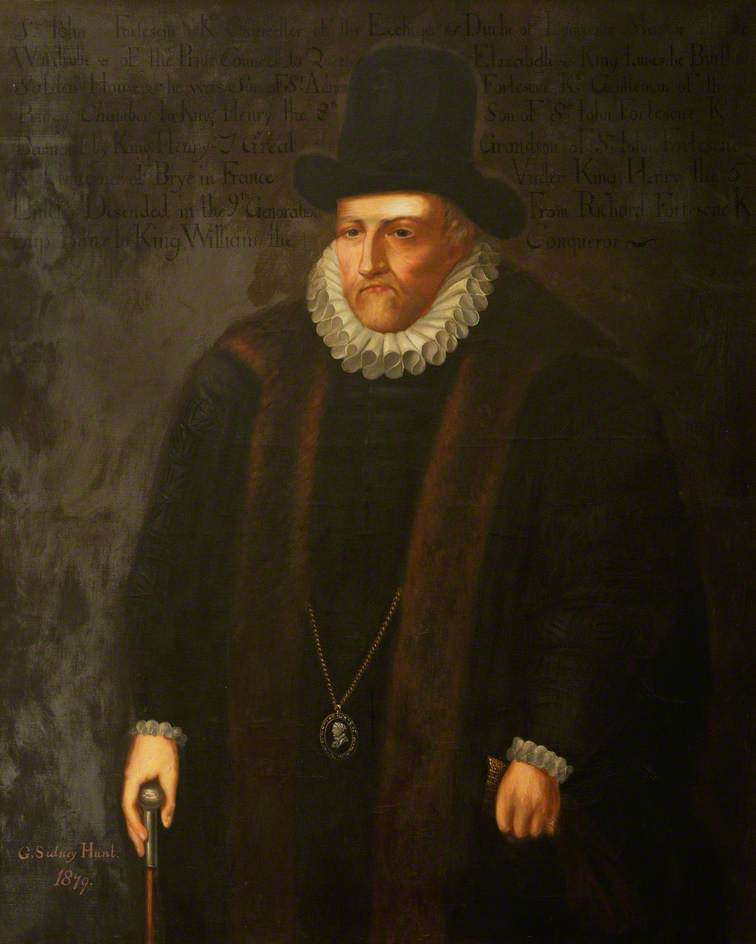
Sir John Fortescue

Sir John Fortescue (c. 1531/1533 – 23 December 1607) of Salden Manor, near Mursley, Buckinghamshire, was the seventh Chancellor of the Exchequer of England, serving from 1589 until 1603.

== Origins ==
Fortescue was the son of Adrian Fortescue, who was martyred and has been beatified. Sir John was a great-grandson of Sir Geoffrey Boleyn, Lord Mayor of London (1457), and thus a second-cousin of Queen Elizabeth I. His mother was Anne Reade, daughter of Sir William Reade. He was descended from Sir Richard Fortescue, 3rd son of Sir John Fortescue (died after 1432), Captain of the Castle of Meaux, of Shepham in the parish of Modbury, Devon. He was restored in blood and to his estate at Shirburn in Oxfordshire in 1551.

== Career ==
Fortescue acquired early a considerable reputation as a scholar and was chosen to direct the Princess Elizabeth's classical studies in Mary's reign. On the accession of Elizabeth he was appointed keeper of the great wardrobe. Starting in 1572 he led a largely undistinguished career in Parliament prior to his accession to the chancellorship in 1589, serving in several districts (including for Wallingford), and he continued to serve in Parliament after losing that title. He was also appointed to the Privy Council in 1589 and was knighted in 1601. Fortescue also held the position of Chancellor of the Duchy of Lancaster from 1601 to his death. Fortescue served under Queen Elizabeth I and was knighted in 1592. He inherited the manor of Great Washbourne from his mother.

Fortescue was involved in the purchase of a pair of uncut diamonds for Elizabeth I in 1595. By means of his lucrative employments he amassed great wealth, with which he bought large estates in Oxfordshire and Buckinghamshire, and kept up a large household. He took a prominent part in public business, was a member of the court of the Star Chamber and an ecclesiastical commissioner, sat on various important commissions, and as chancellor of the exchequer explained the queen's financial needs and proposed subsidies in parliament.

When King James I came to the throne in 1603 at the Union of the Crowns, he stayed at Fortescue's house at Hendon in June 1603, and King James and Anne of Denmark stayed at his manor of Salden on 27 June. Fortescue was disappointed that the King requested he vacate the Chancellor's house to lodge the Scottish favourite Sir George Home.

Fortescue advocated restrictions on the King's power, in part in order to limit the appointment of Scottish people. These reforms were not implemented, and as a result, James dismissed him from his position as Chancellor of the Exchequer. He retained, however, his position in Parliament and as Chancellor of the Duchy of Lancaster, as well as the keeper of the great wardrobe.

As keeper of the Great Wardrobe, in 1603 he issued some fabrics for Anne of Denmark's closet, for the use of her and her household in chapel. These included two palls of cloth of gold for two communion tables, fine linen diaper cloth for four communion tables or desks, fine Holland linen cloth for four other tables, linen for communion towels and four surplices, two bibles, two service books, and other items.

== Death and burial ==
Fortescue was buried in Mursley's parish church in Buckinghamshire, where a monument was erected in his honour.

== Family ==
Fortescue had six children with his first wife Cecilia Ashfield (d. 1571), daughter of Sir Edmund Ashfield of Ewelme. Including:

- Francis Fortescue (1563–1624), who married in 1589 Grace Manners (d. 1624), daughter of Sir John Manners of Haddon Hall, second son of Thomas Earl of Rutland, and of Dorothy Vernon daughter and co-heir of Sir George Vernon. A daughter, Dorothy Vernon (d. 1650), married Sir Robert Throckmorton of Weston-Underwood and Coughton Court.
- William Fortescue of Salden (1562–1629).
- Eleanor Fortescue (1579–1605), who married (1) in 1585, Valentine Piggot (2) Edward Hobart.

He had a seventh daughter with his second wife, Alice Smith, daughter of Christopher Smith of Annables, Hertfordshire, and widow of Richard Robson:

- Margery Fortescue (d. 1613), who married Sir John Pulteney of Misterton, Leicestershire (1585–1617).

Many of his children followed his path in politics, holding positions in Parliament. In 1621 Alice Fortescue, the widow of John Fortescue, sold Tickford Priory in Newport Pagnell to the royal physician, Dr Henry Atkins for £4,500.

The house he built at Salden was demolished. A chair carved with the Fortescue and Ashfield heraldry, presumably from the house, was found in an antique shop in Aylesbury in 1873 and bought by a descendant, Thomas Fortescue, 1st Baron Clermont.

Political offices
Preceded by Walter Mildmay	Chancellor of the Exchequer; 1589–1603	Succeeded by George Home
Preceded by Arthur Grey	Custos Rotulorum of Buckinghamshire; 1594–1600	Succeeded by Francis Fortescue
Preceded by Robert Cecil	Chancellor of the Duchy of Lancaster; 1601–1607	Succeeded by Sir Thomas Parry
Parliament of England
Preceded by Francis Goodwin; John Borlase	Member of Parliament for Buckinghamshire; 1588–1598; With: Thomas Tasburgh 1588–1589; Sir Robert Dormer 1593; Francis Goodwin1597–1598	Succeeded by Francis Fortescue; Alexander Hampden
Preceded by Sir Robert Wroth; Sir John Peyton	Member of Parliament for Middlesex; 1601; With: Sir Robert Wroth	Succeeded by Sir Robert Wroth; Sir W. Fleetwood
