= Thomas Aylesbury (MP) =

English politician

Sir Thomas Aylesbury (died 9 September 1418) was an English politician. He sat as MP for Buckinghamshire in 1391 and September 1397.

He was knighted on 14 August 1378.

== Offices held ==
He also served as commissioner of oyer and terminer in Buckinghamshire in February 1392 and September 1393; commissioner of weirs in June 1398; commissioner of array in December 1399 and September 1403; commissioner of inquiry concerning arson in Cambridgeshire in May 1401, concerning Lollards in Bedfordshire and Buckinghamshire in January 1414; commissioner to suppress sedition in Buckinghamshire in May 1402; commissioner to raise forces to go north with the King's army in Cambridgeshire and Huntingdonshire in May 1405; commissioner to raise royal loans in Cambridgeshire in September 1405, in Bedfordshire, Buckinghamshire, and Northamptonshire in June 1410; commissioner to hold assizes in Northamptonshire in 1410.

He also served as justice of the peace in Buckinghamshire from 28 November 1399 till March 1404, in Cambridgeshire from 16 May 1401 till February 1407, in Huntingdonshire from 8 February 1405 till 1407; tax collector of Cambridgeshire in March 1404; and Sheriff of Bedfordshire and Buckinghamshire from 3 November 1412 till 6 November 1413.

== Family ==
He was the son and heir of John Aylesbury. Before February 1384, he married Isabel, the widow of Sir John Dodyngseles (died 1380). Before December 1399, he married Katherine, elder daughter and coheiress of Sir Laurence Pavenham (died 1399) and they had one son and two daughters (Eleanor and Isabel (or Elizabeth) Aylesbury, who married Sir Thomas Chaworth).
