= George Fleetwood (Tavistock MP) =

English politician

Sir George Fleetwood (1564 – 21 December 1620) was an English politician who sat in the House of Commons at various times between 1586 and 1611.

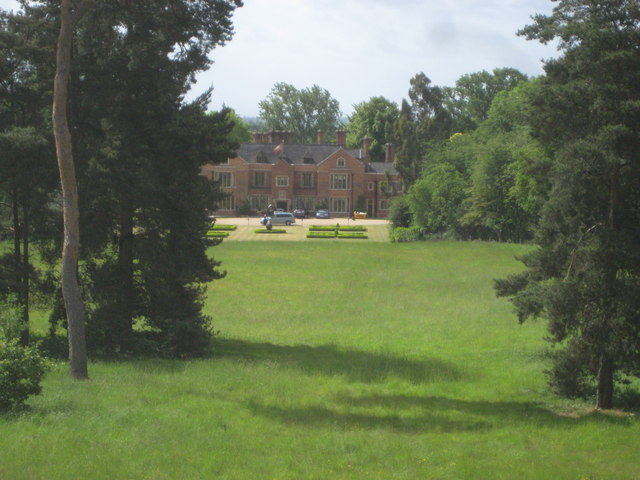
The Vache, Buckinghamshire

Fleetwood was a younger son of Thomas Fleetwood of The Vache, Chalfont St Giles, Buckinghamshire, and his second wife, Bridget Spring, daughter of Sir John Spring of Lavenham, Suffolk. He was educated at New Inn and was at Middle Temple in 1580. He inherited the Vache estate in Buckinghamshire from his father.

In 1586, he was elected Member of Parliament for Wycombe. He was a J.P. for Buckinghamshire from about 1586 and High Sheriff of Buckinghamshire for 1590–91. He was a gentleman pensioner from 1597 until his death. He was knighted in 1603 and in 1604 elected MP for Tavistock.

Fleetwood married Katherine Denny, daughter of Henry Denny, dean of Chester, and his wife Honora Grey, daughter of William Grey, 13th Baron Grey de Wilton and Lady Mary Somerset on 19 April 1586. According to the History of Parliament Online, she was "the relative and probably ward of Sir Francis Walsingham", spymaster to Queen Elizabeth. They had eight sons and six daughters. He was the brother of Henry Fleetwood and William Fleetwood. His seventh son was James Fleetwood, Bishop of Worcester. Via his son Charles (died 1628) he had a grandson named after him, George Fleetwood (1623–1672), who was an English major-general and one of the regicides of King Charles I of England.

Parliament of England
Preceded by John Morley; George Cawfield	Member of Parliament for Wycombe; 1586; With: Thomas Ridley	Succeeded by Owen Oglethorp; Francis Goodwin
Preceded by Henry Grey; Walter Wentworth	Member of Parliament for Tavistock; 1604–1611; With: Edward Duncombe	Succeeded by Edward Duncombe; Francis Glanville
Political offices
Preceded by Francis Cheyne	High Sheriff of Buckinghamshire; 1590–1591	Succeeded by Alexander Hampden
