= John Borlase (MP) =

English politician

John Borlase (c 1527-1593) was an English landowner who represented Buckinghamshire in the House of Commons in 1586-7.

He was the eldest son of Edward Borlase (d. 1544), a London merchant, and his third wife Petronell/Parnell (d. 1564), daughter and co-heir of Sir John Baldwin, Chief Justice of Common Pleas. Through his mother he inherited a substantial estate in Buckinghamshire, which he subsequently extended by purchase and through his marriage to Anne, the daughter and co-heir of Robert Lytton of Knebworth.

He served as a justice of the peace in Buckinghamshire and in 1567-8 served as Sheriff of Bedfordshire and Buckinghamshire and High Sheriff of Buckinghamshire in 1588-9. As a substantial but not leading Buckinghamshire gentleman, he took his turn of serving a single turn in parliament as the junior knight of the shire in 1586.

John and Anne had one son William Borlase (died 1629) and several daughters, including:

- Elizabeth married Samuel Backhouse
- Dorothy married George Tipping of Wheatfield, Oxfordshire
- Anne married Sir Euseby Isham (d. 1626) of Braunston, Northamptonshire.

John died in May 1593 and was buried at Little Marlow. He was survived by his wife, who he left well provided.

Parliament of England
Preceded by Miles Sandys; Griffith Hampden	Member of Parliament for Buckinghamshire; 1586; With: Francis Goodwin	Succeeded by John Fortescue; Thomas Tasburgh
