= Francis Goodwin (MP) =

English politician (1564–1634)

Sir Francis Goodwin (1564–10 August 1634) was an English politician who sat in the House of Commons at various times between 1586 and 1626.

Goodwin was the son of Sir John Goodwin and his second wife Anne Spencer, daughter of Sir William Spencer. In 1586, he was elected Member of Parliament for Buckinghamshire. He was elected MP for Wycombe in 1589. From 1591 he was a J.P. for Buckinghamshire and in 1596 was commissioner for musters. He succeeded to the title of Upper Winchendon in 1597 on the death of his grandfather, and in that year was elected MP for Buckinghamshire again. He was knighted in 1601.

After the Union of the Crowns in 1603, Goodwin gained the office of Surveyor of the jointure lands of Anne of Denmark in Buckinghamshire. This was probably due to his existing connections with Sir Robert Cecil and with Robert Sidney, Viscount Lisle, who served on the queen's council.

Goodwin's election for Buckinghamshire in 1604 in circumstances where he was challenged over outlawry led to a significant constitutional confrontation, "Goodwin's Case", between the House of Commons and James I of England. The result was ultimately overturned but Goodwin was elected later that year in a by-election for Buckingham after the death of the sitting MP. He was elected MP for Buckinghamshire again in 1614. In 1618, he settled the manor of Upper Winchendon on his son Arthur at the time of his marriage. He was re-elected MP for Buckinghamshire in 1621. He obtained a grant from the king of the whole of his inheritance of Upper Winchendon in about 1623. From 1623 to 1624 he was High Sheriff of Buckinghamshire. He was elected MP for Buckinghamshire again in 1625 and in 1626.

Goodwin died at the age of about 70 in 1634.

Goodwin married Elizabeth Grey, daughter of Arthur Grey, 14th Baron Grey de Wilton. Arthur Goodwin was their son.

Parliament of England
| Preceded by Miles Sandys; Griffith Hampden | Member of Parliament for Buckinghamshire; 1586; With: John Borlase | Succeeded by John Fortescue; Thomas Tasburgh |
| Preceded by Thomas Ridley; George Fleetwood | Member of Parliament for Wycombe; 1589; With: Owen Oglethorp | Succeeded by Thomas Tasburgh; Thomas Fortescue |
| Preceded by Sir John Fortescue; Sir Robert Dormer | Member of Parliament for Buckinghamshire; 1597; With: Sir John Fortescue | Succeeded by Francis Fortescue; Alexander Hampden |
| Preceded by Sir Thomas Denton; Sir Edward Tyrrell | Member of Parliament for Buckingham; 1606–1611; With: Sir Thomas Denton | Succeeded by Sir Thomas Denton; Sir Ralph Winwood |
| Preceded by William Fleetwood; Anthony Tyringham | Member of Parliament for Buckinghamshire; 1614–1622; With: Sir William Borlase 1614; William Fleetwood | Succeeded by Sir William Fleetwood; Sir Thomas Denton |
| Preceded by Sir William Fleetwood; Sir Thomas Denton | Member of Parliament for Buckinghamshire; 1625–1626; With: Henry Bulstrode; Sir Thomas Denton | Succeeded by Sir Edward Coke; Sir William Fleetwood |
