= Christopher Pigott =

English Member of Parliament

Sir Christopher Pigott (also Piggot or Pygott) (c. 1558 – 24 October 1613) of Doddershall, near Quainton, Buckinghamshire was an English Member of Parliament for Buckinghamshire from 1604 to 1607.

He was the only surviving son of Thomas Pigott of Doddershall and educated at Oxford University and Gray's Inn.

Pigott entered parliament in 1604 in the wake of an electoral cause celèbre, the disbarring of Francis Goodwin and Sir John Fortescue as the king's solution to an electoral dispute for Buckinghamshire. He was knighted at Theobalds, in August 1604. He then drew attention to himself, contributing to the ongoing debate on the Union by an extreme verbal attack on Scotland and the Scots, in early 1607 (N.S.). At the king's wish, Pigott was then imprisoned in the Tower of London, and stripped of his seat. He was released after about ten days, pleading sickness.

He married twice; firstly Ursula, the daughter and coheiress of Valentine Pigott of Loughton, Buckinghamshire, with whom he had a daughter, and secondly in 1602, Dorothy, the daughter of Richard Ingoldsby, with whom he had a second daughter. He was the father-in-law of the parliamentarian, Sir Thomas Tipping.
