= Custos Rotulorum of Buckinghamshire =

This is a list of people who have served as Custos Rotulorum of Buckinghamshire.

- Sir Francis Bryan bef. 1544 – bef. 1547
- Francis Russell, 2nd Earl of Bedford bef. 1547 – c. 1578
- Arthur Grey, 14th Baron Grey of Wilton c. 1578–1593
- Sir John Fortescue 1594–1600
- Sir Francis Fortescue 1600–1617
- George Villiers, 1st Duke of Buckingham 1617–1628
- John Egerton, 1st Earl of Bridgewater 1628–1649
- Interregnum
- John Egerton, 2nd Earl of Bridgewater 1660–1686
- George Jeffreys, 1st Baron Jeffreys 1686–1689
- Thomas Wharton, 5th Baron Wharton 1689–1702

For later custodes rotulorum, see Lord Lieutenant of Buckinghamshire.
