= John Barton (Buckinghamshire MP, died 1432) =

English politician

John Barton (died 7 February 1432) was an English politician. He sat as MP for Buckinghamshire in January 1397, 1401, January 1404, 1407 and November 1414.

== Political career ==
He served as justice of the peace for Buckinghamshire from 12 November 1397 till 1399, 2 March 1404 till c. 1415, in Oxfordshire from 8 March 1410 till February 1412. He also served as commissioner of weirs in Buckinghamshire, Essex, and Hertfordshire and Middlesex in June 1398, February 1416 and July 1416, respectively.

Barton was commissioner of arrest in Buckinghamshire in March 1399. He served as commission of array in December 1399 and October 1403, and commissioner of inquiry concerning poaching in King's Langley park in Hertfordshire in February 1403.

He was commissioner of oyer and terminer in Bedfordshire in November 1414, in London in September 1416, in Buckinghamshire and Hertfordshire in March and July 1430. Barton was also commissioner of gaol delivery in Newgate in November 1415, November 1417, January 1420 and March 1422, and commissioner to raise royal loans in Bedfordshire and Buckinghamshire in March 1430 and March 1431.

He was tax collector of Bedfordshire in March 1404; and Recorder of London by 21 September 1415 till c. September 1422.

== Family ==
He was the first son of William Barton (died 1389) by his wife Emma. He was the brother of John Barton, another Buckinghamshire MP. He had no children.
