= John Barton (Buckinghamshire MP, died 1434) =

English politician (died 1434)

John Barton (died 31 January 1434) was an English politician. He sat as MP for Buckinghamshire in April 1414, 1417, 1419, 1422 and 1423.

== Political career ==
He also served as commissioner of inquiry concerning claim to certain estates made by Henry IV's sister, Elizabeth, Countess of Huntingdon in Wiltshire in May 1403, concerning descent of the manor of Radstone in Northamptonshire in March 1404, concerning wastes in Queen Joan's forest of Wychwood in Oxfordshire in July 1412, concerning rebellions, insurrections and felonies in Derbyshire, Lincolnshire and Nottinghamshire in May 1414, concerning estates late of Edmund, Earl of Stafford in Northamptonshire in March 1416, concerning treasons and insurrections in March 1418, concerning concealments in Oxfordshire in March 1418; commissioner of oyer and terminer in Hertfordshire in November 1409; commissioner to survey the liberties of the abbey of St Albans in May 1413; commissioner of array in Buckinghamshire in May 1418; commissioner to raise royal loans in November 1419 and April 1421; commissioner to assess liability to contribute to a tax in April 1431; and commissioner of arrest in June 1431.

He also served as steward of St. Albans abbey by January 1408 till after 1429; justice of the peace of Buckinghamshire from 18 February 1412 till his death in Northamptonshire from 9 July 1419 till February 1422; and escheator of Bedfordshire and Buckinghamshire from 30 November 1417 till 4 November 1418.

== Family ==
He was the younger brother of John Barton. Probably by July 1412, he was married to Isabel (died 1456), the daughter and eventual co-heiress of William Wilcotes by Elizabeth, the daughter and heiress of Sir John Trillow. They had no children.
