= William Fortescue (died 1629) =

English politician

Sir William Fortescue (c. 1562–1629), of Salden House, in Mursley, Buckinghamshire and of Westminster and Clerkenwell, Middlesex, was an English politician.

He was a member (MP) of the parliament of England for Sudbury in 1593, for Chipping Wycombe in 1597 and for Stockbridge in 1604.
