= Thomas Denton (died 1633) =

English landowner and politician

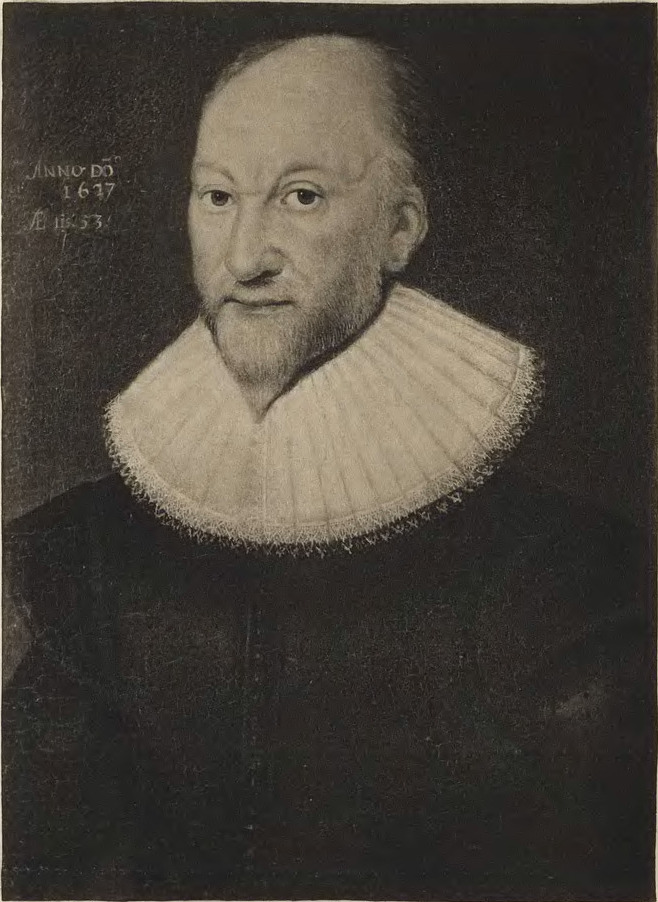
- Died: 19 September 1633
- Occupation: Politician
- Spouse(s): Susan Temple
- Parent(s): Alexander Denton, of Hillesden
- Position held: Member of the 1604-11 Parliament, Member of the 1614 Parliament, Member of the 1621-22 Parliament, Member of the 1624-25 Parliament, Member of the 1626 Parliament, Member of the 1628-29 Parliament

Sir Thomas Denton (1574-1633) was an English landowner and politician who sat in the House of Commons between 1604 and 1629.

Denton was the eldest son of Alexander Denton of Hillesden and his wife Mary Martin, daughter of Sir Roger Martin, Lord Mayor of London. He succeeded his father in 1576. Following his marriage in 1594, he lived at Stowe, Buckinghamshire, and in 1601, he was High Sheriff of the county. He was knighted by the King at Salden, in July 1603.

In 1604, Denton was elected Member of Parliament for Buckingham. He was re-elected MP for Buckingham in 1614, when on 3 June 1614 he brought in a bill into the House of Commons to fix the Summer Assizes at the Town of Buckingham. In 1624 he was elected MP for Buckinghamshire and was re-elected for Buckinghamshire in 1626. In 1628 he was elected MP for Buckingham again and sat until 1629 when King Charles decided to rule without parliament for eleven years.

Denton died at Hillesden and was buried there on 23 September 1633.

In 1594 Denton married Susan Temple, daughter of John Temple of Stowe and sister of Sir Thomas Temple. He was succeeded by his son Alexander. His daughter Margaret married Sir Edmund Verney.

Parliament of England
Preceded by Christopher Hatton; Robert Newdigate	Member of Parliament for Buckingham; 1604–1622; With: Sir Edward Tyrrell 1604–1606; Sir Francis Goodwin 1606–1611; Sir Ralph Winwood 1614; Richard Oliver 1621–1622	Succeeded by Richard Oliver; Sir Edmund Verney
Preceded by Sir Francis Goodwin; Sir William Fleetwood	Member of Parliament for Buckinghamshire; 1624; With: Sir William Fleetwood	Succeeded by Sir Francis Goodwin; Henry Bulstrode
Preceded by Sir Francis Goodwin; Henry Bulstrode	Member of Parliament for Buckinghamshire; 1626; With: Sir Francis Goodwin	Succeeded by Sir Edward Coke; Sir William Fleetwood
Preceded by Sir Alexander Denton; Richard Oliver	Member of Parliament for Buckingham; 1628–1629; With: Richard Oliver	Parliament suspended until 1640
Political offices
Preceded by Sir William Clerke	High Sheriff of Buckinghamshire; 1601	Succeeded by William Borlase
