= John Aylesbury =

English politician

Sir John Aylesbury (6 May 1334 – 7 December 1409) was an English politician. He sat as MP for Buckinghamshire in 1376, October 1377, 1379, November 1380, 1381 and January 1390.

By January 1361, he was knighted.

== Offices held ==
He also served as sheriff of Bedfordshire and Buckinghamshire from 17 November 1365 till 5 November 1371, 7 November 1373 till 12 December 1374, 26 November 1377 till 25 November 1378, 1 November 1381 till 1383, 18 November 1386 till 1387.

He also served as commissioner of inquiry concerning embracery and forestailing in Bedfordshire and Buckinghamshire in October 1370, concerning concealments in Bedfordshire, Buckinghamshire, Cambridgeshire and Huntingdonshire in January 1371, concerning oppressions in Bedfordshire in November 1374, concerning forfeited goods in Buckinghamshire in August and November 1375, concerning concealments in Buckinghamshire in December 1376, concerning trespasses in Buckinghamshire in July 1378, concerning wastes at Tickford priory estates in Buckinghamshire in October 1389, concerning the value of estates of Robert de Vere, Duke of Ireland in Buckinghamshire in August 1392; commissioner of oyer and terminer in February 1371, February 1378, January 1384, July 1384, February 1392; commissioner of array in Bedfordshire and Buckinghamshire in February 1371, in Buckinghamshire in April 1377, July 1377, March 1380, March 1392; commissioner to collect the parochial subsidy in February 1372; commissioner of arrest in Bedfordshire and Buckinghamshire in July 1378, in Hertfordshire in December 1381; commissioner of gaol delivery in Aylesbury and Bedford in July 1378, in Aylesbury in August 1381; commissioner to hold assizes in Buckinghamshire in December 1383, February 1388 and February 1392; commissioner to administer oaths in support of the Lords Appellant in March 1388.

He also served as justice of the peace in Buckinghamshire from 6 December 1375 till 1382, 18 September 1385 till November 1397; and tax surveyor of Buckinghamshire in August 1379.

== Family ==
He was born and baptised on 6 May 1334 in Weldon, Northamptonshire. He was the son of Thomas Aylesbury (whom he predeceased) by Joan, the daughter of Sir Ralph Basset. Before Michaelmas 1359, he married Isabel and probably had two sons, including Sir Thomas Aylesbury, one of his sons predeceased him. Before November 1369, he married Alice. Basset owned the Manor of Wyvelsthore, which he then left to Aylesbury, who owned it until his death in 1409.
