= Henry Bulstrode =

English politician

Henry Bulstrode (28 December 1578 – August 1643) was an English politician who sat in the House of Commons in 1614 and 1625.

Bulstrode was the eldest son of Edward Bulstrode of Upton, Buckinghamshire and matriculated at University College, Oxford on 15 December 1592, aged 13. In 1595, he was a student of the Inner Temple.

In 1614, he was elected Member of Parliament (MP) for Helston, Cornwall and, in 1625, elected MP for Buckinghamshire. He was a justice of the peace for Buckinghamshire from 1618 until his death and appointed High Sheriff of Buckinghamshire for 1631–32. During the Civil War he was briefly Governor of Aylesbury and Henley for the Parliamentary forces, in which he was a Colonel of a foot regiment. Bulstrode died in August 1643, aged 64, and was buried in the family vault at Upton.

== Sources ==
- "BULSTRODE, Henry (1578-1643), of Horton, Bucks". History of ParliamentOnline.

Parliament of England
Preceded by Sir John Leigh; Robert Naunton	Member of Parliament for Helston; 1614; With: Sir Robert Killigrew	Succeeded by Sir Thomas Stafford; William Noy
Preceded by Sir Francis Goodwin; Sir Thomas Denton	Member of Parliament for Buckinghamshire; 1625; With: Sir Francis Goodwin	Succeeded by Sir Francis Goodwin; Sir Thomas Denton
