= Francis Fortescue =

English politician

Sir Francis Fortescue (ca. 1563–1624), KB was an English politician.

== Life ==
Francis was the eldest surviving son of John Fortescue of Salden at Mursley and his wife, Cecily Ashfield. His brothers were William Fortescue and Thomas Fortescue II.

In 1589, he married Grace Manners (d. 1624), daughter of Sir John Manners of Haddon Hall, second son of Thomas Earl of Rutland, and of Dorothy Vernon daughter and co-heir of Sir George Vernon. They had at least one son, his heir, John. A daughter, Dorothy Vernon (d. 1650), married Sir Robert Throckmorton of Weston Underwood, Buckinghamshire and Coughton Court.

== Career ==
In 1600, he became the Custos Rotulorum of Buckinghamshire and in 1608 High Sheriff of Buckinghamshire. In 1589, 1593 and 1597 he was MP for Buckingham, and in 1601 MP for Buckinghamshire.

Fortescue was a Catholic recusant who welcomed the priests John Gerard and Anthony Hoskins alias Rivers at Salden.

Political offices
Preceded by Sir John Fortescue	Custos Rotulorum of Buckinghamshire; 1600–1617	Succeeded by The Duke of Buckingham
Preceded by Sir William Andrews	High Sheriff of Buckinghamshire; 1608–1609	Succeeded by Anthony Greenway
