= Mursley =

Village in Buckinghamshire, England

Coordinates: 51.950°N 0.812°W

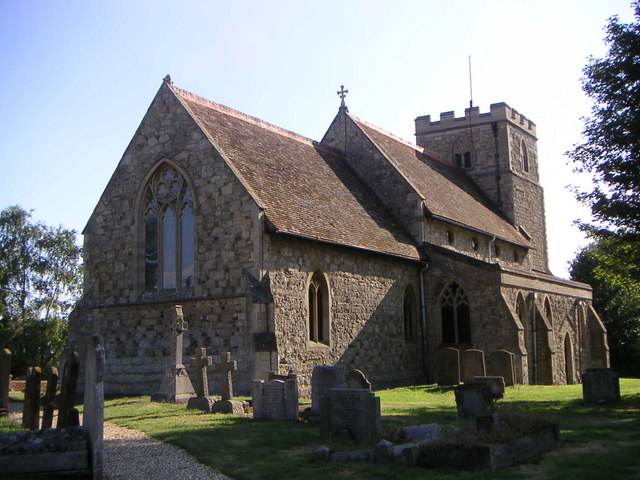
- St Mary the Virgin's Church

- Location within Buckinghamshire
- Population: 611 (2011 Census)
- OS grid reference: SP817286
- Unitary authority: Buckinghamshire
- Ceremonial county: Buckinghamshire
- Region: South East
- Country: England
- Sovereign state: United Kingdom
- Post town: MILTON KEYNES
- Postcode district: MK17
- Dialling code: 01296
- Police: Thames Valley
- Fire: Buckinghamshire
- Ambulance: South Central
- UK Parliament: Buckingham and Bletchley

Mursley is a small village in and also a civil parish in Buckinghamshire, England. It is located about three miles east of Winslow and about seven miles south west of Central Milton Keynes. (Note: About four miles from West Bletchley.)

The village name is Old English in origin, and is thought to mean 'Myrsa's woodland clearing'. In the Domesday Book of 1086 the village was recorded as Muselai, with the form Murselai being attested from the thirteenth century.

The village was at one time a market town, by virtue of a royal charter granted in 1230, and the centre of the local deanery. "The prosperity of the town continued until well into the 17th century" but around the middle of the 18th century, Mursley was described as having "dwindled into a neglected village', being 'small and depopulated', the parish having about 66 families and 258 souls."

There was at one time a manor in the locality called "Salden", within which stood a manor house built by the Chancellor of the Exchequer from 1589 until 1603, John Fortescue of Salden (1531–1607). The manor house was visited by King James I and Anne of Denmark in 1603. It has since disappeared.

Actor David Tomlinson, who played George Banks in Mary Poppins and Mr. Emelius Browne in Bedknobs and Broomsticks, lived and raised his children in Mursley until his death in 2000. Tomlinson became known around the village for flying very low in his Tiger Moth and on one occasion, he crash landed in a field near his house and was tried for, but acquitted of, reckless flying.

The Beechams estate in the village draws its name from Sir Thomas Beecham who resided in Mursley Hall which used to exist on the site of this estate.

Mursley's Church of England School is a Victorian, Church of England primary school. It is a voluntary controlled infant school, which has approximately 70 pupils aged four to seven.

== Sport and leisure ==
Mursley has a non-League football team Mursley United F.C. who play at the playing field in Station Road.

There is also a cricket team called Mursley CC.
