= Alexander Hampden =

English politician

Alexander Hampden (1546–1618) was an English politician.

He was the eldest son of Michael Hampden of Hartwell House, Buckinghamshire. He succeeded his father in 1571 and was knighted in 1603 by King James I on his journey south to take the throne.

He was appointed High Sheriff of Buckinghamshire for 1591–92 and was elected Member of Parliament for Buckinghamshire in 1601. He was probably the Alexander Hampden who served as a Captain of the Buckinghamshire Trained Bands when they were called out during an invasion scare in 1599.

Although married to Elizabeth he had no children. Most of his estate was left to a relative, Thomas Lee of East Claydon, Buckinghamshire.

Political offices
Preceded by George Fleetwood	High Sheriff of Buckinghamshire; 1591–1592	Succeeded by Henry Longueville
