= List of knights commander of the Royal Guelphic Order =

Below is an incomplete list of knights commander of the Royal Guelphic Order, from the creation of the order in 1815 until 1837. A Hanoverian order, appointments have not been conferred by the British monarch (in their role as King of Hanover) since the death of King William IV in 1837, when the personal union of the United Kingdom and Hanover ended. After 1837 the order continued to be conferred by the Kingdom of Hanover, until the Kingdom was dissolved by Prussia in 1866. After this it became an order of the Royal House of Hanover.

== List of knights commander of the Royal Guelphic Order ==
Appointment	Name	Notes (GCH denotes Grand Cross of the order)
1815	Colonel Hugh Halkett	Promoted GCH 1851
1815	Major-General Sir James Frederick Lyon	Promoted GCH 1817
1815	Major-General Sir Colin Halkett	Promoted GCH 1820
1815	Major-General Sir Benjamin Bloomfield	Promoted GCH 1819, later Baron Bloomfield
1816	Major-General Sir Colquhoun Grant	Promoted GCH 1831
1816	Major-General Sir Hussey Vivian, Bart.	Promoted GCH 1831, later Baron Vivian
1816	Colonel Sir George Adam Wood	
1816	Sir William Congreve, Bart.	
1817	Colonel Sir William Robe	
1817	Major-General Francis de Rottenburg	
1817	Major-General Sir Alexander Dickson	
1818	Rear Admiral Sir Home Riggs Popham	
1818	Colonel Sir Benjamin D'Urban	
1819	Lieutenant-General Sir Tomkyns Hilgrove Turner	Promoted GCH 1827
1819	Major-General Sir John Elley	
1819	Major-General Sir Herbert Taylor	Promoted GCH 1825
1819	Captain The Honourable Charles Paget	Promoted GCH 1832
1819	Major-General Sir Andrew Barnard	Promoted GCH 1833
1820	Major-General George Airey	
1820	Lieutenant-Colonel Sir Robert Gardiner	
1820	Major-General James Murray, 1st Baron Glenlyon	
1821	Major-General Sir Charles William Doyle	Promoted GCH 1837
1821	Lieutenant Lord Francis Conyngham	Promoted GCH 1823, later 2nd Marquess Conyngham
1821	Sir William Knighton, Bart.	Physician to the King, promoted GCH 1823
1821	Major-General Sir Edward Kerrison, Bart.	Promoted GCH 1831
1821	Lieutenant-General Sir Samuel Ford Whittingham	
1821	Major-General Sir George Augustus Quentin	
1821	Major-General Sir William Keir Grant	Promoted GCH 1835
1821	Colonel Henry Frederick Cooke	
1822	Lieutenant-General Sir Richard Church	Promoted GCH 1837
1822	The Honourable Francis Nathaniel Burton	Promoted GCH 1824
1824	Colonel Sir James Henry Reynett	
1824	Lieutenant-Colonel Sir John Harvey	
1825	Sir Henry Halford, Bart.,	(civil division) Promoted GCH 1830
1827	Sir Frederick Beilby Watson	(civil division)
1827	Sir Jonathan Wathen Waller, Bart.	(civil division) Promoted GCH 1830
1827	Sir John Conroy, Bart.	(civil division) Comptroller and Private Secretary to the Duchess of Kent
1828	Frederick Augusta Barnard	Librarian to the King
1828	Captain The Honourable Robert Cavendish Spencer	Private Secretary to the Duke of Clarence
1829	Major-General Sir James Carmichael Smyth, Bart	
1829	Lord Albert Conyngham	(civil division) Secretary of Legation at Berlin, later Baron Londesborough
1829	Colonel Sir Augustus Frederick d'Este	(civil division)
1830	Colonel Sir Willoughby Cotton	
1830	Sir Philip Sidney	(civil division) Promoted GCH 1831, later Baron De L'Isle and Dudley
1830	Major-General Sir Alexander Bryce	
1831	Major-General The Honourable Sir Frederick Ponsonby	
1831	Major-General Sir James Charles Dalbiac	
1831	Colonel Sir Charles Wade Thornton	Promoted GCH 1837
1831	Major-General Sir John Brown	
1831	Major-General Sir James Campbell	
1831	Major-General Sir Benjamin Charles Stephenson	Promoted GCH 1834
1831	Major-General Sir Henry Wheatley	Promoted GCH 1834
1831	Sir George Harrison	(civil division)
1831	Captain Sir George Francis Seymour	Promoted GCH 1834
1831	Captain Sir Thomas Ussher	
1831	Colonel Stephen Remnant Chapman	
1831	Sir William Burnett	(civil division)
1831	Lieutenant-Colonel The Honourable Sir Edward Cust	
1831	Lieutenant-General Sir Phineas Riall	
1831	Lieutenant-General Sir William Hutchinson, d. 1845?	
1831	Major-General Sir Lewis Grant	
1831	Major-General Sir Amos Godsill Robert Norcott	
1831	Major-General Sir James Cockburn, Bart.	
1831	Colonel Sir Evan John Murray MacGregor, Bart.	
1831	Colonel Sir Neil Douglas	
1831	Captain Sir William Howe Mulcaster	
1831	Colonel William, baron von Tuyll	
1831	Sir William Pym	(civil division)
1832	Lieutenant-General Sir Warren Peacocke	
1832	Lieutenant-General Charles Bulkeley Egerton	
1832	Lieutenant-General Sir William Sheridan	
1832	Major-General Sir William Paterson	
1832	Major-General John Frederick Sigismund Smith	
1832	Major-General William Nicolay	
1832	Major-General Arthur Benjamin Clifton	
1832	Colonel George Whitmore	
1832	Colonel Leonard Greenwell	
1832	Colonel Robert Henry Dick	
1832	Colonel Frederick William Trench	
1832	Captain William Augustus Montagu	
1832	Sir William Franklin	(civil division)
1832	Sir Henry Seaton	(civil division)
1832	Major-General John Macleod	
1832	Major-General Frederick William Mulcaster	
1832	Major-General Claude François, vicomte de Rivarol	
1832	Major-General Sir William Parker Carrol	
1832	Major-General John Hanbury	
1832	Colonel David Ximenes	
1832	Captain Sir John Marshall	
1832	Sir John Webb	(civil division)
1832	Major-General Joseph Straton	
1832	Colonel John George Woodford	
1832	George Hamilton Seymour	(civil division) Promoted GCH 1834
1832	Captain Sir Humphrey Fleming Senhouse	
1832	Lieutenant-General Sir Thomas Browne	
1832	Major-General William Douglas	
1832	Major-General William Cornwallis Eustace	
1832	Captain Nisbet Josiah Willoughby	
1832	Captain Andrew Pellatt Green	
1832	Captain Arthur Farquhar	
1832	Commissary-General Sir John Bisset	(civil division)
1832	John Deas Thomson	(civil division)
1832	Sir George Jackson	(civil division)
1832	Commodore Charles Marsh Schomberg	
1832	Rear Admiral Sir Charles Cunningham	
1832	Rear Admiral The Honourable Courtenay Boyle	
1832	General Sir Walter Tremenheere	
1833	Lieutenant-General David Tinling-Widdrington	
1833	Major-General William Harris, 2nd Baron Harris	
1833	Rear Admiral Edward Durnford King	
1833	Captain Sir Francis Augustus Collier	
1833	Captain Richard Spencer	
1833	Colonel John Boscawen Savage	
1833	Captain Sir Samuel John Brooke Pechell, Bart.	
1833	Lieutenant-General Henry John Cumming	
1834	Lieutenant-General Evan Lloyd	
1834	Lieutenant-General Thomas Gage Montresor	
1834	Major-General Samuel Trevor Dickens	
1834	Major-General James Kearney	
1834	Major-General Lorenzo Moore	
1834	Major-General James Viney	
1834	Major-General Henry Willoughby Rooke	
1834	Major-General Sir Patrick Ross	
1834	Colonel Henry King	
1834	Rear Admiral John Ferris Devonshire	
1834	Captain James Hillyar	
1834	Captain Salusbury Pryce Davenport	
1834	Commissary-General Sir Robert Hugh Kennedy	(civil division)
1834	Commissary-General Sir William Henry Robinson	(civil division)
1834	Sir John Woolmore	(civil division)
1834	Lieutenant-General Sir Joseph Maclean	
1834	Rear Admiral Sir Hugh Pigot	
1834	Commodore Robert Barrie	
1834	Colonel Patrick Lindesay	
1834	Lieutenant-Colonel Edmund Currey	
1834	Colonel Sir Samuel Gordon Higgins	
1834	Captain The Honourable Sir Henry Duncan	
1835	Captain Charles Bullen	
1835	Captain William Henry Dillon	
1835	Captain William Elliott	
1835	Captain Edmund Lyons	Later Baron Lyons
1835	Major-General Thomas Bligh St George	
1835	Major-General Thomas Pearson	
1835	Major-General Maurice Charles O'Connell	
1835	Colonel Patrick Doherty	
1835	Colonel Sir Octavius Carey	
1835	Captain Lord James Townshend	
1835	Lieutenant-Colonel Charles Holland Hastings	
1835	Commodore Sir Samuel Warren	
1835	Colonel The Honourable Sir Horatio Townshend	
1835	Rear Admiral Sir Robert Lewis Fitzgerald	
1835	Sir Francis Bond Head	(civil division)
1836	Major-General Wiltshire Wilson	
1836	Major-General Sir Charles William Maxwell	
1836	Major-General William Gabriel Davy	
1836	Captain The Honourable Fleetwood Pellew	
1836	Captain The Honourable James Ashley Maude	
1836	Captain John Strutt Peyton	
1836	Captain Richard O'Conor	
1836	Captain Henry Hart	
1836	Captain James John Gordon Bremer	
1836	Sir Robert Ker Porter	(civil division)
1836	Captain Sir John Franklin	(civil division)
1836	Sir John Nicol Robert Campbell	(civil division) Later baronet
1837	Lieutenant-General Alexander Halkett	
1837	Major-General Robert Barton	
1837	Major-General Augustus De Butts	
1837	Major-General Thomas Hawker	
1837	Vice Admiral Sir Adam Drummond	
1837	Captain Sir David Dunn	
1837	Captain Edward Chetham	
1837	Captain Thomas Mansell	
1837	Woodbine Parish	(civil division)
1837	Major-General Sir Edward Bowater	
1837	Major-General James Macdonnell	
1837	Major-General Robert McCleverty	
1837	Rear Admiral John Wentworth Loring	
1837	Colonel George Arthur	Later baronet
1837	David Davies	(civil division)
1837	William Frederick Chambers	(civil division)
1837	Captain Thomas Barker Devon	

== See also ==
- Royal Guelphic Order
- List of knights grand cross of the Royal Guelphic Order

== Sources ==
- The Gentleman's Magazine
- Shaw, William Arthur The Knights of England, p. 454-462, at Google Books
