= John Strutt =

John Strutt may refer to:

- John Strutt (1727–1816), British Member of Parliament for Maldon
- John James Strutt, 2nd Baron Rayleigh (1796–1873) of the Barons Rayleigh
- John William Strutt, 3rd Baron Rayleigh (1842–1919), physicist and Nobel Prize winner
- John Arthur Strutt, 5th Baron Rayleigh (1908–1988) of the Barons Rayleigh
- John Gerald Strutt, 6th Baron Rayleigh (born 1960) of the Barons Rayleigh

== See also ==
- John Strutt Peyton (1786–1838), captain in the British Navy, Knight Commander of the Royal Guelphic Order
