= General Wilson =

General Wilson may refer to:

== United Kingdom ==
- Alexander Wilson (British Army officer) (1858–1937), British Army major general
- Bevil Wilson (1885–1975), British Army major general
- Charles William Wilson (1836–1905), British Army major general
- Dare Wilson (1919–2014), British Army major general
- David Wilson (Royal Marines officer) (born 1949), Royal Marines major general
- Francis Adrian Wilson (1874–1954), British Army major general
- Gordon Wilson (British Army officer) (1887–1971), British Army lieutenant general
- Henry Fuller Maitland Wilson (1859–1941), British Army lieutenant general
- Henry Maitland Wilson (1881–1964), British Army general
- Sir Henry Wilson, 1st Baronet (1864–1922), British Army general
- James Wilson (British Army officer) (1921–2004), British Army lieutenant general
- John Wilson (British Army officer, died 1856) (1780–1856), British Army general
- Robert Wilson (British Army officer, born 1777) (1777–1849), British Army general
- Roger Wilson (Indian Army officer) (1882–1966), British Indian Army general
- Samuel Wilson (East India Company officer) (fl. 1780s–1820s), British East India Company major general
- Samuel Herbert Wilson (1873–1950), British Army brigadier general
- Thomas Needham Furnival Wilson (1896−1961), British Army major general
- Thomas Spencer Wilson (1727–1798), British Army general
- William Deane Wilson (1843–1921), British Army surgeon-general
- Wiltshire Wilson (1762–1842), British Army lieutenant general

== United States ==
- Arthur R. Wilson (1894–1956), U.S. Army major general
- B. Edwin Wilson (fl. 1980s–2010s), U.S. Air Force major general
- Claudius C. Wilson (1831–1863), Confederate States Army brigadier general
- Cornell A. Wilson Jr. (fl. 1970s–2000s), U.S. Marine Corps major general
- David Wilson (U.S. Army general) (fl. 1990s–2020s), U.S. Army major general
- Donald Wilson (general) (1892–1978), U.S. Army Air Forces major general
- Frances C. Wilson (fl. 1970s–2000s), U.S. Marine Corps lieutenant general
- George Wilson (American football halfback) (1905–1990), U.S. Marine Corps brigadier general
- James H. Wilson (1837–1925), Union Army major general
- John Moulder Wilson (1837–1919), Union Army brigadier general
- Johnnie E. Wilson (born 1944), U.S. Army four-star general
- Lester S. Willson (1839–1919), Union Army brevet brigadier general
- Louis H. Wilson Jr. (1920–2005), U.S. Marine Corps four-star general
- Louis L. Wilson Jr. (1919–2010), U.S. Air Force general
- Robert Wilson (Missouri politician) (1803–1870), Missouri Militia brigadier general
- Roscoe Charles Wilson (1905–1986), U.S. Air Force lieutenant general
- Samuel V. Wilson (1923–2017), U.S. Army lieutenant general
- Stephen W. Wilson (born c. 1959/1960), U.S. Air Force four-star general
- Walter K. Wilson Jr. (1906–1985), U.S. Army lieutenant general
- Winston P. Wilson (1911–1996), U.S. Air Force major general

== Other ==
- Arthur Gillespie Wilson (1900–1982), Australian Army major general
- Lachlan Chisholm Wilson (1871–1947), Australian Army brigadier general
- Richard Wilson (general) (born 1955), Australian Army major general

== See also ==
- Attorney General Wilson (disambiguation)
