= John Smith (British Army officer, born 1754) =

British army general

General Sir John Smith GCH
- Born: 22 February 1754; Brighton, Sussex
- Died: 2 July 1837 (aged 83); Charlton, London
- Burial place: Saint Luke's Church, Charlton, Kent
- Spouse(s): Mary Leigh Grace Weatherall (m. 1782–1832)
- Military career
- Allegiance: United Kingdom
- Branch: British Army
- Service years: 1768–1837
- Rank: General
- Unit: Royal Artillery
- Commands: Colonel-Commandant, Royal Horse Artillery
- Conflicts: American Revolutionary War; Canadian Campaign; Siege of Fort St. Jean (POW) (WIA); Philadelphia Campaign; Battle of Brandywine; Battle of Germantown; Siege of Fort Mifflin; Battle of Monmouth; Southern Theatre; Siege of Charleston; Yorktown Campaign; Siege of Yorktown (POW); French Revolutionary Wars; West Indies Campaign; Invasion of Trinidad; Anglo-Russian Invasion of Holland; Battle of Alkmaar; Battle of Castricum; Napoleonic Wars
- Awards: Knight bachelor
- Other work: Acting Lieutenant-Governor of Gibraltar

General Sir John Smith GCH (22 February 1754 – 2 July 1837) was a British Army officer. In his early career as a Royal Artillery officer he fought in the American War of Independence, being twice captured and imprisoned by the Americans. In his later career Smith was involved in expanding the British Empire in the West Indies by protecting its trade routes, helped keep control of the islands of Gibraltar and Madeira and commanded various artillery regiments.

== Early and family life ==
Smith was born at Brighton, Sussex, England, on 22 February 1754. There is no record of who his parents were. His first wife, Mary Leigh, died in childbirth, and he married second Grace Weatherall at Chatham, Kent on 17 April 1782, with whom he had five children in total.

== Military career ==
Smith entered the Royal Military Academy, Woolwich on 1 March 1768 and was commissioned as a second lieutenant in the Royal Artillery on 15 March 1771. He was posted to Canada in 1773. After the outbreak of the American Revolutionary War he was involved in the Siege of Fort St.-Jean. He and the other defenders surrendered Saint-Jean on 2 November 1775 and were captured. He was held prisoner by the Americans for four years before being released in January 1777.

He rejoined the British forces at Rhode Island and saw further action during the American Revolutionary War. He fought with Sir William Howe during the Philadelphia campaign at the Battle of Brandywine, the Battle of Germantown and during the Battle of Mud Island. In 1778 he served under General Sir Henry Clinton during the withdrawal to New York and saw further combat at the Battle of Monmouth.

He was promoted to first lieutenant on 7 July 1779. He fought at the capture of Charlestown on 12 May 1780. In 1781 he served in Virginia before being forced to surrender at Yorktown on 20 October with Lord Cornwallis' troops. After being released he returned to England and was promoted to captain-lieutenant on 28 February 1782. In 1785, he was posted to Gibraltar for five years, where he was promoted to captain on 21 May 1790. He was then appointed the Officer Commanding Number 6 Company, 1st Battalion, Royal Artillery.

With the start of the French Revolutionary Wars, Smith was appointed second in command of the artillery intended to accompany Lord Moira's expedition to France. However, in October 1795 he was ordered instead to the West Indies with Sir Ralph Abercromby. He was present at the British occupation of Saint Lucia and Saint Vincent in 1796, and commanded the artillery at the capture of Trinidad from the Spanish in February 1797. Command of all thirteen companies of the Royal Artillery serving in the West Indies then fell to him, and on 27 August 1797 he was promoted to lieutenant-colonel. Unfortunately, he became sick soon after, and had to return to England.

In September and October 1799 Smith commanded the artillery during the Duke of York's Anglo-Russian invasion of Holland. He fought at the battles of Alkmaar on 2 October and Castricum on 6 October. He returned to England with the rest of the army at the beginning of November. On 20 July 1804 he was promoted to colonel and given command of the artillery at Gibraltar. He remained there for ten years. He was promoted to major-general on 25 July 1810 having twice been given temporary command of the garrison as Lieutenant-Governor of Gibraltar. On 3 July 1815 he was appointed colonel-commandant of the 7th Battalion, Royal Horse Artillery, was promoted to lieutenant-general in 1819, and received the Grand Cross of the Hanoverian Guelphic Order being knighted on 10 August 1831. He was further honoured by appointment as colonel-commandant of the Royal Horse Artillery in 1833 and was promoted full general on 10 January 1837.

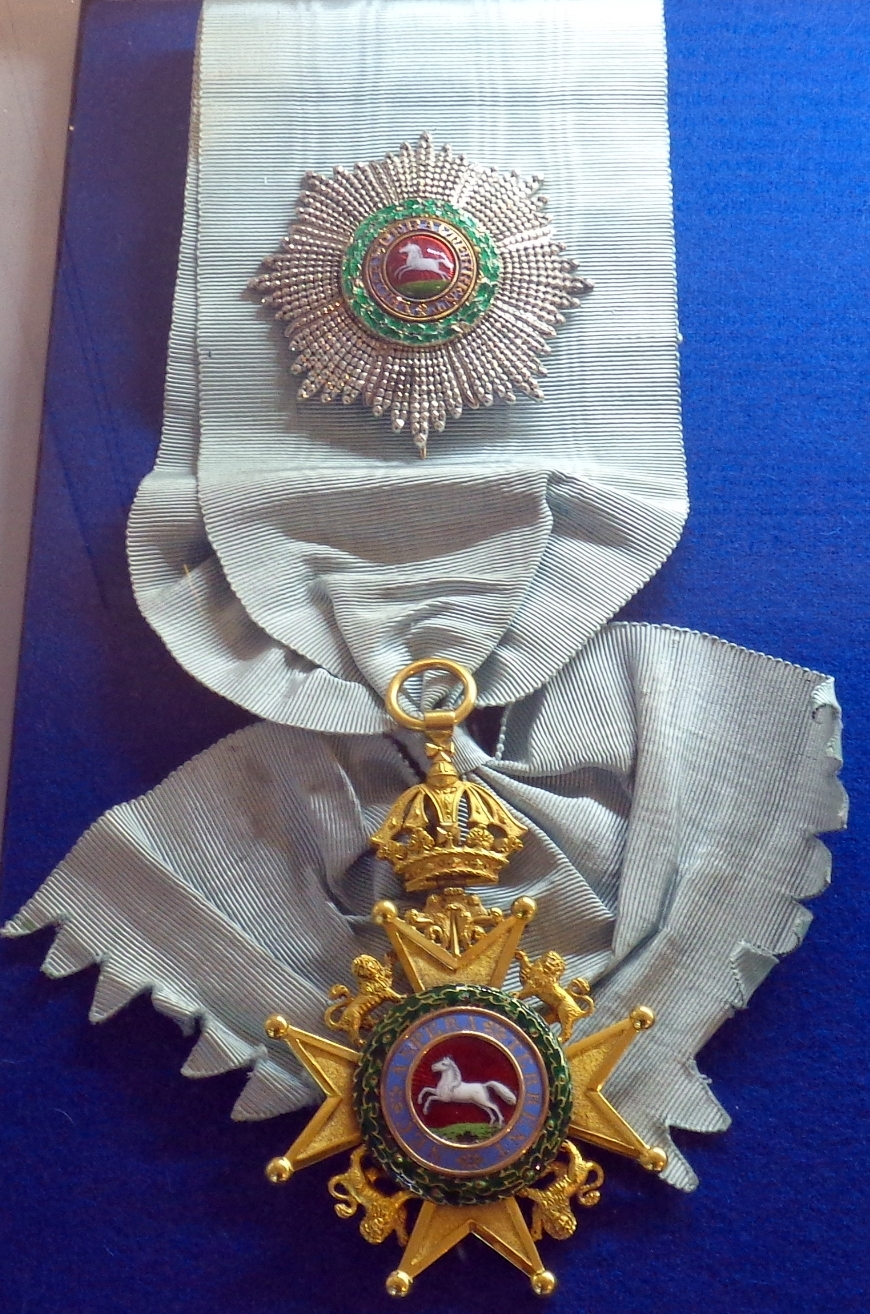
Insignia of a GCH

== Death and burial ==
General Smith died on 2 July 1837, aged eighty-three, in Charlton, Kent, where he was buried at the parish church of Saint Luke on 10 July.

== See also ==
- Governor of Gibraltar
- List of Royal Artillery batteries
- List of knights grand cross of the Royal Guelphic Order
