= Edward Burnaby Greene =

Edward Burnaby Greene (c. 1735-1788) was an English landowner, poet, and translator. He inherited the Norland estate in modern-day Holland Park in 1740 from his paternal grandfather, Thomas Greene.

His son, Captain Pitt Burnaby Greene, Royal Navy, married Johanna Tinling, sister of Sir David Latimer Tinling-Widdrington.

Four years after Greene's death, Benjamin Vulliamy purchased the Norland Estate for £4,270.
