= List of knights grand cross of the Royal Guelphic Order =

Below is an incomplete list of knights grand cross of the Royal Guelphic Order from the creation of the order in 1815 until 1837. A Hanoverian order, appointments have not been conferred by the British monarch (in their role as King of Hanover) since the death of King William IV in 1837, when the personal union of the United Kingdom and Hanover ended. After 1837 the order continued to be conferred by the Kingdom of Hanover, until the Kingdom was dissolved by Prussia in 1866. After this it became an order of the Royal House of Hanover.

== List of knights grand cross of the Royal Guelphic Order ==
Appointment	Name	Image	Notes
28 April 1815	George, Prince of Wales (The Prince Regent)		Later King George IV
28 April 1815	Prince Frederick, Duke of York and Albany		
28 April 1815	Prince William, Duke of Clarence and St Andrews		Later King William IV
28 April 1815	Prince Ernest Augustus, Duke of Cumberland and Teviotdale		Later King of Hanover
28 April 1815	Prince Augustus Frederick, Duke of Sussex		
28 April 1815	Prince Adolphus, Duke of Cambridge		
28 April 1815	Prince William Frederick, Duke of Gloucester and Edinburgh		
22 Mar 1816	Prince Leopold of Saxe-Coburg		Later King of the Belgians
1816	Field Marshal Arthur Wellesley, 1st Duke of Wellington		
1816	General Henry William Paget, 1st Marquess of Anglesey		
1816	Robert Stewart, Viscount Castlereagh		(Civil Division) Later Marquess of Londonderry
1816	General Charles William Stewart, 1st Baron Stewart		Later Marquess of Londonderry
1816	Lieutenant-General Sir Henry Clinton		
1816	General The Honourable Sir Charles Colville		
1816	Lieutenant-General Sir James Kempt		
1816	General Sir George Don		
1816	Lieutenant-General Rowland Hill, 1st Baron Hill		Later Viscount Hill
1816	Lieutenant-General The Right Honourable Sir George Murray		
1816	Lieutenant-General Sir Robert Henry MacFarlane		
1816	General Charles Stanhope, 3rd Earl of Harrington		
1816	George James Cholmondeley, 1st Marquess of Cholmondeley		(Civil Division)
1817	Lieutenant-General The Right Honourable Sir Thomas Maitland		
1817	Vice-Admiral Sir Edmund Nagle		
1817	General Sir Harry Calvert, Bart.		
1817	Lieutenant-General Lord William Cavendish Bentinck		
1817	Lieutenant-General Sir James Campbell, Bart.		
1817	Lieutenant-General Sir James Frederick Lyon		
23 April 1817	Colonel John Fane, Lord Burghesh		Later Earl of Westmorland
1817	Lieutenant-General Stapleton Cotton, 1st Baron Combermere		Later Viscount Combermere
1817	Lieutenant-General Sir Henry Tucker Montresor		
1817	Lieutenant-General Sir John Murray, Bart.		
1818	Lieutenant-General Sir Henry Frederick Campbell		
1818	Lieutenant-General William Carr Beresford, 1st Baron Beresford		Later Viscount Beresford
1818	Vice-Admiral Sir Thomas Francis Fremantle		
1818	General Francis Rawdon-Hastings, 1st Marquess of Hastings		
1819	Francis Charles Seymour-Conway, Earl of Yarmouth		(Civil Division) Later Marquess of Hertford
1819	John Bourke, 4th Earl of Mayo		(Civil Division)
1819	The Right Honourable Sir George Henry Rose		(Civil Division)
1819	General Sir Charles Hastings, Bart.		
1819	Admiral The Right Honourable Sir John Borlase Warren, Bart.		
1819	Alleyne FitzHerbert, 1st Baron St Helens		(Civil Division)
1819	General Samuel Hulse		
1819	Major-General Benjamin Bloomfield, 1st Baron Bloomfield		
1820	Lieutenant-General Sir Colin Halkett		
1820	Lieutenant-General Sir Charles Asgill, Bart.		
1820	Lieutenant-General John Macleod		
1820	Lieutenant-General John Hope		
1821	Richard Le Poer Trench, 2nd Earl of Clancarty		(Civil Division)
1821	Lieutenant-General Henry Conyngham, 1st Marquess Conyngham		
1822	Brook Taylor		(Civil Division)
1823	James Duff, 4th Earl Fife		(Civil Division)
1823	Francis Nathaniel Conyngham, Earl of Mount Charles		(Civil Division) Later Marquess Conyngham
1823	Sir William Knighton, Bart.		(Civil Division)
1824	Sir Francis Nathaniel Burton		(Civil Division)
1825	Prince George, Duke of Cambridge		
1825	Lieutenant-General Sir Rufane Shaw Donkin		
1825	Percy Sidney Clinton Smythe, 6th Viscount Strangford		(Civil Division)
1825	Major-General Sir James Willoughby Gordon Bart.		
1826	Lieutenant-General Sir Herbert Taylor		
1826	Richard Charles Francis Meade, 3rd Earl of Clanwilliam		(Civil Division)
1826	Lieutenant-General Sir John Byng		Later Earl of Strafford
1827	Lieutenant-General Sir Tomkyns Hilgrove Turner		
1827	Lieutenant-General Sir William Houston, Bart.		
1827	The Right Honourable William Henry Fremantle		
1827	Lieutenant-General Lord George Thomas Beresford		
1827	George Ashburnham, 3rd Earl of Ashburnham		
1827	Prince George of Cumberland		Later Duke of Cumberland and Teviotdale and King of Hanover
1829	The Right Honourable Robert Gordon		(Civil Division)
1830	William George Hay, 18th Earl of Erroll		(Civil Division)
1830	Richard William Curzon-Howe, 2nd Viscount Curzon		(Civil Division) Later Earl Howe
1830	Sir Henry Halford, Bart.		(Civil Division)
1830	Sir Jonathan Wathen Waller, Bart.		(Civil Division)
1830	John Delaval Carpenter, 4th Earl of Tyrconnell		(Civil Division)
1830	William Wellesley-Pole, 1st Baron Maryborough		(Civil Division) Later Earl of Mornington
1830	General Sir James Steuart, Bart.		
1830	George Boyle, 4th Earl of Glasgow		(Civil Division)
1831	General The Honourable Sir Henry George Grey		
1831	Lieutenant-General The Right Honourable Sir Richard Hussey Vivian, Bart.		
1831	Admiral Sir William Hargood		
1831	Admiral Lord Amelius Beauclerk		
1831	Major-General Sir Edward Kerrison, Bart.		
1831	Lieutenant-General Sir Thomas Makdougall Brisbane, Bart.		
1831	Lieutenant-General Sir John Keane		Later Baron Keane
1831	Lieutenant-General Sir Thomas Bradford		
1831	Lieutenant-General Sir Colquhoun Grant		
1831	George Hamilton Chichester, Earl of Belfast		(Civil Division) Later Marquess of Donegall
1831	Lucius Bentinck Cary, 10th Viscount Falkland		(Civil Division)
1831	Vice-Admiral Lord James O'Brien		Later Marquess of Thomond
1831	Sir Robert John Wilmot-Horton, Bart.		(Civil Division)
1831	Lieutenant-General Sir John Smith		
1831	General George Cockburn		Later Baronet
1831	The Right Honourable Sir Gore Ouseley, Bart.		
1831	Sir Philip Charles Sidney		(Civil Division) Later Baron de L'Isle and Dudley
1831	Colonel Lord Frederick FitzClarence		(Civil Division)
1831	Sir Henry Watkin Williams-Wynn		(Civil Division)
1831	Sir Edward Cromwell Disbrowe		(Civil Division)
1832	General Josiah Champagné		
1832	General Martin Hunter		
1832	General Sir John Fraser		
1832	Captain Lord Adolphus FitzClarence		(Civil Division)
1832	Captain The Honourable Sir Charles Paget		
1832	Constantine Henry Phipps, 2nd Earl of Mulgrave		(Civil Division) Later Marquess of Normanby
1832	Vice-Admiral The Honourable Sir Henry Blackwood, Bart.		
1832	Admiral Sir Isaac Coffin, Bart.		
1832	Vice-Admiral Peter Halkett		Later Baronet
1832	Rear-Admiral Sir Edward William Campbell Rich Owen		
1833	Lieutenant-General Frederick Augustus Wetherall		
1833	William Basil Percy Feilding, 7th Earl of Denbigh		(Civil Division)
1833	Lieutenant-General The Honourable Alexander Duff		
1833	The Right Honourable Charles Richard Vaughan		(Civil Division)
1834	William Charles Keppel, 4th Earl of Albemarle		(Civil Division)
1833	George William Campbell, 6th Duke of Argyll		(Civil Division)
1833	Major-General Sir Andrew Francis Barnard		
1834	Thomas Cartwright		(Civil Division)
1834	Lieutenant-General Henry Bayly		
1834	Admiral Sir Charles Edmund Nugent		
1834	Major-General Sir Henry Wheatley		
1834	Vice-Admiral Sir William Hall Gage		
1834	John Cust, 1st Earl Brownlow		(Civil Division)
1834	Robert Grant		(Civil Division)
1834	Captain Sir George Francis Seymour		
1834	Major-General Sir Benjamin Charles Stephenson		
1834	George Child Villiers, 5th Earl of Jersey		(Civil Division)
1834	William Pitt Amherst, 1st Earl Amherst		(Civil Division)
1835	Thomas Egerton, 2nd Earl of Wilton		(Civil Division)
1835	Richard Temple-Nugent-Brydges-Chandos-Grenville, Marquess of Chandos		(Civil Division) Later Duke of Buckingham and Chandos
1835	Lieutenant-General Sir John Slade		
1835	Vice-Admiral Sir John Gore		
1835	Lieutenant-General Sir William Keir Grant		
1835	John FitzGibbon, 2nd Earl of Clare		(Civil Division)
1835	Major-General Sir James Cockburn, Bart.		
1835	Lieutenant-General Ralph Darling		
1835	Vice-Admiral Sir Charles Rowley		Later Baronet
1836	Vice-Admiral Richard Dacres		
1836	Sir George Hamilton Seymour		(Civil Division)
1836	Admiral Sir John Poer Beresford,Bart.		
1836	John Elphinstone, 13th Lord Elphinstone		(Civil Division)
1836	Sir Astley Paston Cooper, Bart.		(Civil Division)
1836	Lieutenant-General Sir Edward Blakeney		
1836	Captain Lord John Frederick Gordon		(Civil Division)
1836	Major-General Sir Lionel Smith		Later Baronet
1836	Major-General Sir John Colborne		Later Baron Seaton
1837	Mubarak Ali Khan, Nawab Nazim of Murshidabad		
1837	Lieutenant-Colonel Sir Richard Church		
10 May 1837	General John Gustavus Crosbie		
1837	Major-General Alexander George Fraser, 17th Lord Saltoun		
1837	The Right Honourable Sir Charles Edward Grey		(Civil Division)
1837	The Right Honourable Sir Joseph Planta		(Civil Division)
1837	Lieutenant-General Sir Charles William Doyle		
1837	Major-General Sir Charles Wade Thornton		

== See also ==
- Royal Guelphic Order
- List of knights commander of the Royal Guelphic Order

== Sources ==
- Burke's Peerage
- Dictionary of National Biography
- Shaw, William Arthur The Knights of England, p. 447-453, at Google Books
