= Thomas Mansell =

Thomas Mansell, or Mansel, may refer to:

- Thomas Mansell (Royal Navy officer) (1777–1858), British navy officer
- Sir Thomas Mansell, 1st Baronet (1556–1631), Welsh politician
- Tom Mansell (1855–1934), American baseball player
- Thomas Mansel, 1st Baron Mansel (1667–1723), Welsh nobleman
- T. Norman Mansell, American architect

== See also ==
- Mansel Thomas (1909–1986), Welsh composer
