= Tinling =

Tinling is an English surname that may refer to the following people:

- David Tinling-Widdrington (1757–1839), British Army officer
- James Tinling (1889–1967), American film director
- James Collingwood Tinling (1900–1983), Royal Air Force officer
- Ted Tinling (1910–1990), English fashion designer and author
