= Thomas Henry Shadwell Clerke =

British soldier and journalist (1792–1849)

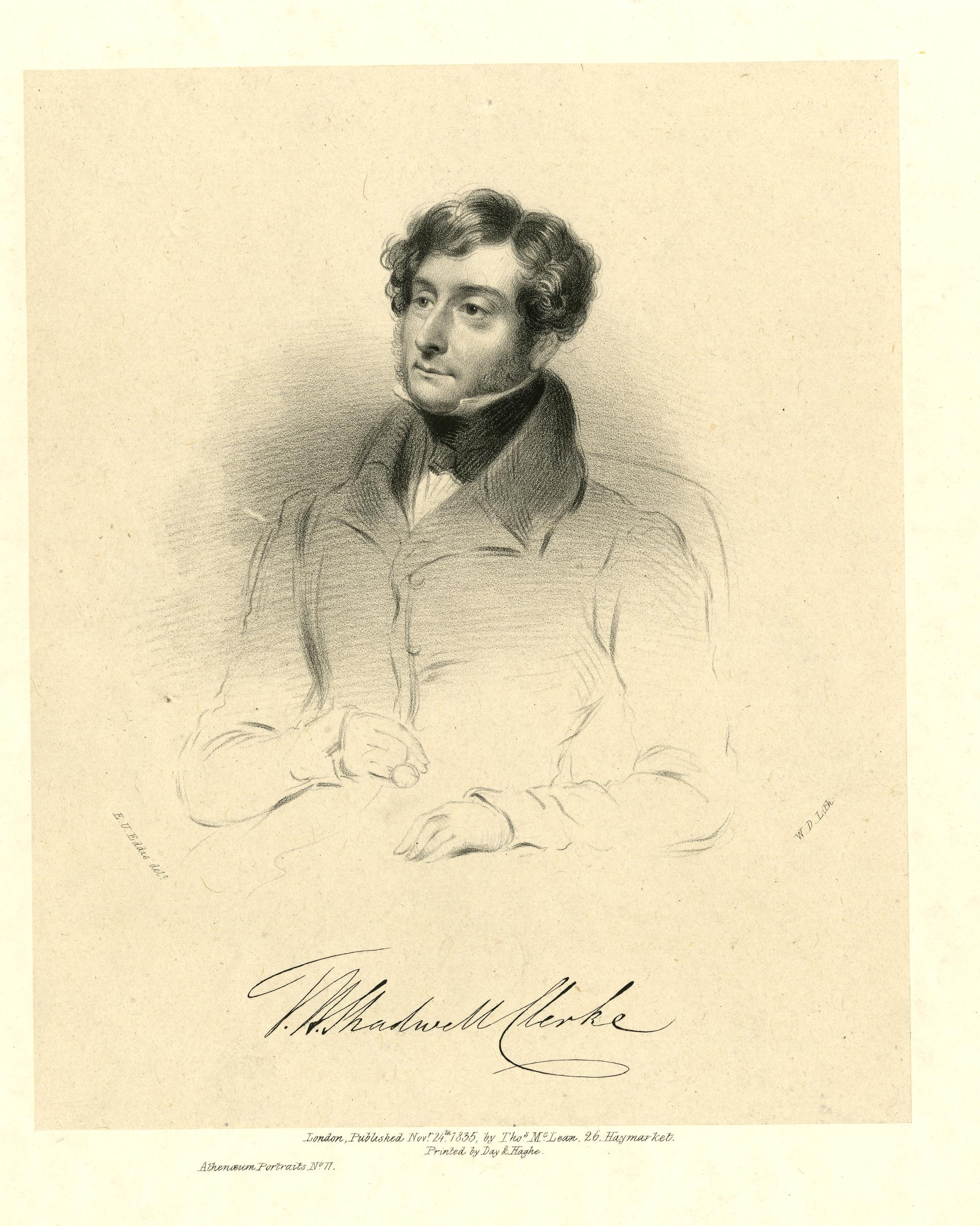
- Born: 1792
- Died: 1849 (aged 56–57)
- Military career
- Allegiance: United Kingdom
- Branch: British Army
- Service years: 1808–1830
- Rank: Major
- Conflicts: Peninsular War
- Other work: Journalist, editor

Thomas Henry Shadwell Clerke, KH (1792–1849), was an Irish soldier and military journalist.

Clerke was a native of Bandon, Cork. Being intended for the army, a profession also adopted by his brothers, St. John Augustus Clerke, who died a lieutenant-general and colonel 75th Foot, 17 January 1870 and William Clerke, afterwards a major in the 77th Foot, he was sent to the Royal Military College, Great Marlow, where he distinguished himself by his abilities. He was appointed to an ensigncy without purchase in 1808 and as a subaltern in 28th and 5th Foot, he served through the Peninsular campaigns until the loss of his right leg in the combat at Redinha in 1811 incapacitated him for further active service. On the recommendation of Lord Wellington, he was promoted to a company in the 1st Garrison Battalion, with which served until its reduction in 1814.

He afterwards served with the 2nd Battalion, 57th Foot, and on the army depot staff. He was promoted to a majority unattached in 1830. He became the editor of Colburn's United Service Magazine when that journal was started in January 1829, and so continued until July 1842. On the death of Colonel Gurwood, he was entrusted with the task of seeing the last volume of Selections from the Wellington Despatches through the press. He possessed a familiar acquaintance with the French, Italian, and Spanish languages, and, although his name does not appear as the author of any scientific or other works, was a very active member of the British Association and of various learned societies. At the time of his death he was a Knight of the Royal Hanoverian Order (1831), a Fellow of the Royal Society (elected 10 April 1833), and vice-president of the Royal United Service Institution, of which he had been one of the originators. He was also a fellow of the Royal Astronomical and Geological Societies and for a short time had been honorary foreign secretary of the Royal Geographical Society.

He died of paralysis at his residence, Brompton Grove, London, on 19 April 1849.

== Namesakes ==
Two prominent features close to Mortlake, Victoria, in Australia, were named "Mount Shadwell" and "Mount Clerke" in his honour by the Surveyor General Major Thomas Livingston Mitchell when he passed through the area during his third expedition of 1836–37.
