= Seymour Tremenheere =

Hugh Seymour Tremenheere (1804–1893) was an English academic, barrister, publicist and author, who worked as a schools inspector and mines inspector.

== Early life ==
He was born at Wootton House, Gloucestershire, on 22 January 1804, the son of Walter Tremenheere and his wife Frances Apperley; Charles William Tremenheere (1813–1898) of the Royal Engineers was his brother. He was educated at Winchester School from 1816, and matriculated as a scholar from New College, Oxford, on 30 January 1824. He was a fellow of his college from 1824 to 1856, graduated B.A. 1827 and M.A. 1832, and was called to the bar at the Inner Temple on 21 November 1834.

After three years' practice as a barrister, Tremenheere was made a revising barrister on the western circuit.

== Public servant ==
Tremenheere entered public service, and was sent in 1839 to Newport to investigate John Frost's rebellion. He subsequently served on numerous Royal Commissions, and was instrumental in bringing about fourteen Acts of Parliament with social aims.

In January 1840 Tremenheere was appointed an inspector of schools. He was a member of the Central Society of Education, and his appointment came about through the support of Baldwin Francis Duppa, the Society's secretary. He was the first British schools inspector, with his colleague Rev. John Allen, who represented the Committee for Council on Education. He made nine reports to the committee of the council on education on the state of schools in England and Wales. He found, however that his right to free comment in reports was in practice curtailed, and resigned the post. The problem arose in January 1842, with his report on 66 school of the British and Foreign School Society. He came under political pressure to withdraw from Lord Wharncliffe, but refused to alter the report. Joseph Fletcher took over as inspector for the British and Foreign School Society, from 1844.

In October 1842 Tremenheere became an assistant poor-law commissioner, and in 1843 a commissioner for inquiring into the state of the population in the mining districts, on which he made fifteen reports between 1844 and 1858. He was appointed under ill-defined provisions of the Mines and Collieries Act 1842, by Sir James Graham, 2nd Baronet, a sole appointee who held the post for 16 years. While he had the title Inspector of Mines, his remit did not require him to inspect mine workings, and he did not go underground.

A friend of Harriet Martineau, Tremenheere met William Wordsworth through her in 1845.

In 1855 and 1861 Tremenheere made inquiries into the management of bleaching works and lace manufactories. Appointed one of the commissioners in 1861 for inquiring into the employment of children and young persons in trades and manufactures, he joined in making six reports on this subject between 1863 and 1867. One of those, with Edward Carleton Tufnell, was on printing, bleaching and dyeing. As one of the commissioners on the employment of young persons and women in agriculture, he took part in writing four reports to parliament between 1867 and 1870. He also reported on grievances complained of by the journeymen bakers, on the operations of bakehouse regulations, and on the tithe commutation acts.

== Later life ==
After his retirement on 1 March 1871, after 31 years' public service, Tremenheere was made a C.B. on 8 August. He had succeeded his uncle, Henry Pendarves Tremenheere, in 1841 in the property of Tremenheere and Tolver, near Penzance. For three years, 1869–71, he was president of the Royal Geological Society of Cornwall. He died at 43 Thurloe Square, London, on 16 September 1893.

== Works ==
Tremenheere was the author of:

- Observations on the proposed Breakwater in Mount's Bay and on its Connection with a Railway into Cornwall, 1839.
- Notes on Public Subjects made during a Tour in the United States and in Canada, 1852.
- The Political Experience of the Ancients, in its bearing upon Modern Times, 1852, republished as A Manual of the Principles of Government, 1882 and 1883.
- The Constitution of the United States compared with our own, 1854.
- Translations from Pindar into English Blank Verse, 1866.
- A New Lesson from the Old World: a summary of Aristotle's lately discovered work on the Constitution of Athens, 1891.
- How Good Government grew up, and how to preserve it, 1893. Advocates for mixed government, quoting Plato and Aristotle.

== Family ==
Tremenheere married, on 2 April 1856, Lucy Bernal, third daughter of Ralph Bernal, and widow of Vicesimus Knox III, son of Vicesimus Knox. She died on 7 October 1872, leaving two daughters, Florence Lucy Bernal who married Ernest Edward Leigh Bennett, and Evelyn Westfaling who married George Marcus Parker, barrister of the Inner Temple.
