= Frederick von Wissell =

British military officer

Colonel Sir Frederick von Wissell KCH CB (died 1820) was a British Army officer during the Napoleonic Wars. (Note: Some sources call him Frederich de Wissell)

== Biography ==
Wissell had the temporary rank of major in the 8th line battalion Kings German Legion (KGL) 24 May 1806. He was appointed brevet lieutenant-colonel by 4 June 1813 and lieutenant-colonel 3rd line battalion KGL on 8 September, 1814. He served in the Baltic in 1807 and the Mediterranean between 1808 and 1812. He participated in the Peninsula War, serving in Spain in 1813 and the South of France in 1813 and 1814. He was posted to the Netherlands in 1814 and was at the Battle of Waterloo in 1815, where he took command of the 1st Brigade of the King's German Legion after Colonel Charles du Plat was severely wounded. He was placed on half pay from 21 February 1816. In 1820 he was brevet colonel in the Hanoverian 2nd Battalion of Guards. He died at Wiesbaden, in the Duchy of Nassau on 16 December 1820. He was a Knight Commander of the Hanoverian Guelphic Order, and a Companion of the Bath, Military Division.
