= Attorney General Wilson =

Attorney General Wilson may refer to:

- Alan Wilson (South Carolina politician) (born 1973), Attorney General of South Carolina
- Alexander Wilson (Wisconsin politician) (1833–1888), Attorney General of Wisconsin
- Charles Wilson (British Columbia politician) (1841–1924), Attorney General of British Columbia
- Edmund Wilson Sr. (1863–1923), Attorney General of New Jersey
- Fred O. Wilson (1903–1983), Attorney General of Arizona
- George P. Wilson (1840–1920), Attorney General of Minnesota
- John Frank Wilson (1846–1911), Attorney General of the Territory of Arizona
- Karen Freeman-Wilson (born 1960), Attorney General of Indiana
- Margaret Wilson (born 1947), Attorney-General of New Zealand
- Scott Wilson (judge) (1870–1942), Attorney General of Maine
- Walter Horatio Wilson (1839–1902), Attorney-General of Queensland
- Will Wilson (Texas politician) (1912–2005), Attorney General of Texas

== See also ==
- Jody Wilson-Raybould (born 1971), Attorney General of Canada
- General Wilson (disambiguation)
