= Percy William Doyle =

English diplomat

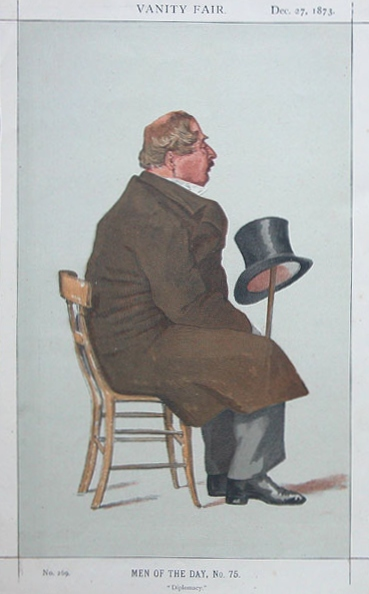
"Diplomacy". Caricature of Percy William Doyle by Coïdé published in Vanity Fair in 1873.

Percy William Doyle CB (1806? – 21 February 1887) was a British diplomat and "a popular member of London society".

== Biography ==
The youngest son of General Sir C. W. Doyle, he was first attached to the British Mission in Washington in 1825. He was appointed in 1829 to Madrid. In 1831 in Madrid he visited one of his father's close friends, José de Palafox. Percy Doyle was appointed in 1836 Paid Attaché at Constantinople. He was appointed on 6 December 1842 Secretary of Legation to Mexico and was appointed on 4 January 1843 British Chargé d'Affaires to Mexico but diplomatic relations were broken off later in that year because of an incident involving Antonio López de Santa Anna. In 1847 Doyle was reappointed as British Chargé d'Affaires to Mexico and, embarking aboard HMS Vixen on 13 October 1847, arrived in Mexico in December of that year. From 24 December 1851 to 19 February 1858 Doyle was British Minister Plenipotentiary to Mexico. However, his heath failed him in 1856 and in 1858 he retired from the Diplomatic Service on a pension. In March 1858 he was appointed CB (Companion of the Order of the Bath).

Doyle’s collection of Mexican antiquities, made ‘during his residence in that republic’, was sold at auction by Sotheby’s on 3/4 January 1859 for a total of £382. 5s. 6d. .... Doyle appears to have continued to collect, but concentrated on European material. No longer employed, but with a good pension, he seems to have been a ‘man about town’ on the fringes of the royal family, frequenting the theatre, court levées and other society occasions. ... He never married.
