= John Strutt Peyton =

English naval officer (1786–1838)

Captain Sir John Strutt Peyton KCH
- Born: 14 January 1786; London, England
- Died: 20 May 1838 (aged 52) London, England
- Allegiance: Great Britain; United Kingdom
- Branch: Royal Navy
- Service years: 1797–1838
- Rank: Captain
- Conflicts: War of the Third Coalition; War of the Fifth Coalition; Walcheren Campaign

Sir John Strutt Peyton, KCH (1786–1838) was a captain in the Royal Navy.

== Lineage ==
John Strutt Peyton, born in London on 14 January 1786, was the son of William Peyton of the Navy Office, grandson of Admiral Joseph Peyton, and great-grandson of Commodore Edward Peyton. His father's three brothers, too, were all in the navy; one of them, John, who died a rear-admiral in 1809, was captain of the Defence in the Battle of the Nile. His grandmother was a daughter of Commander John Strutt; his mother was the daughter of Commander Jacob Lobb, who died in command of the Kingfisher sloop on the American station in 1773, and was sister of Captain William Granville Lobb, afterwards a commissioner of the navy.

== Career ==
Peyton went first to sea in October 1797, on board the Hector, off Cadiz; was then for three years in the Emerald in the Mediterranean, and in January 1801 was appointed to the San Josef, Nelson's flagship in the Channel. With Nelson he was moved to the St. George, in which he was in the Baltic and afterwards off Cadiz and in the West Indies, for part of the time under the command of his uncle, Captain Lobb. During 1802–3 he served, in quick succession, in several frigates in the Channel or in the North Sea, and in August 1803 was sent out to the Victory, carrying Nelson's flag off Toulon. In March 1805 he was appointed acting-lieutenant of the Canópus, from which he was moved in May to the Ambuscade frigate with Captain William Durban, employed during the next two years in the Adriatic. Peyton's commission as lieutenant was dated 7 October 1805. In July 1807, having been sent to destroy a vessel which ran herself ashore near Ortona, he was wounded in the right elbow by a musket-bullet; the arm had to be amputated, and he was invalided.

On 1 December 1807 he was promoted to the rank of commander, and from June 1809 to February 1811 he commanded the Ephira brig in the North Sea, in the Walcheren expedition, and afterwards off Cadiz. He was then appointed to the Weazel in the Archipelago; and on 26 September 1811 was posted to the Minstrel of 20 guns, in which, and afterwards in the Thames, he was employed on the coast of Valencia and Catalonia till near the end of the war, during which time he was repeatedly engaged with the enemies' batteries and privateers, and received the thanks of Sir Edward Pellew, the commander-in-chief. In September 1813 the Thames returned to England and was paid off. On 25 January 1836 he was nominated a KCH, and in June 1836 was appointed to the Madagascar of 46 guns, in which he went out to the West Indies.

== Personal and death ==
He married, in 1814, a daughter of Lieutenant Woodyear, Royal Navy, of St. Kitts. They had three daughters and two sons, the elder of whom, Lumley Woodyear, died a retired commander in 1885.

In the spring of 1838 Peyton was compelled to invalid. John Strutt Peyton died in London on 20 May.

== Sources ==
- James, William (1902). The Naval History of Great Britain. New ed. Vol. 5. London: Macmillan and Co., Ltd. pp. 346–349.
- Laughton, J. K.; Lambert, Andrew (2004). "Peyton, Sir John Strutt (1786–1838), naval officer". Oxford Dictionary of National Biography. Oxford University Press. Retrieved 11 September 2022.
- Marshall, John (1828). "Peyton, John Strutt". Royal Naval Biography. Supplement, Part 2. London: Longman, Rees, Orme, Brown and Green. pp. 438–444.

Attribution:

- This article incorporates text from a publication now in the public domain: Laughton, John Knox (1896). "Peyton, John Strutt". In Lee, Sidney (ed.). Dictionary of National Biography. Vol. 45. London: Smith, Elder & Co. pp. 138–139.
