= Charles William Doyle =

British Army officer

Lieutenant-General Sir Charles William Doyle GCH CB
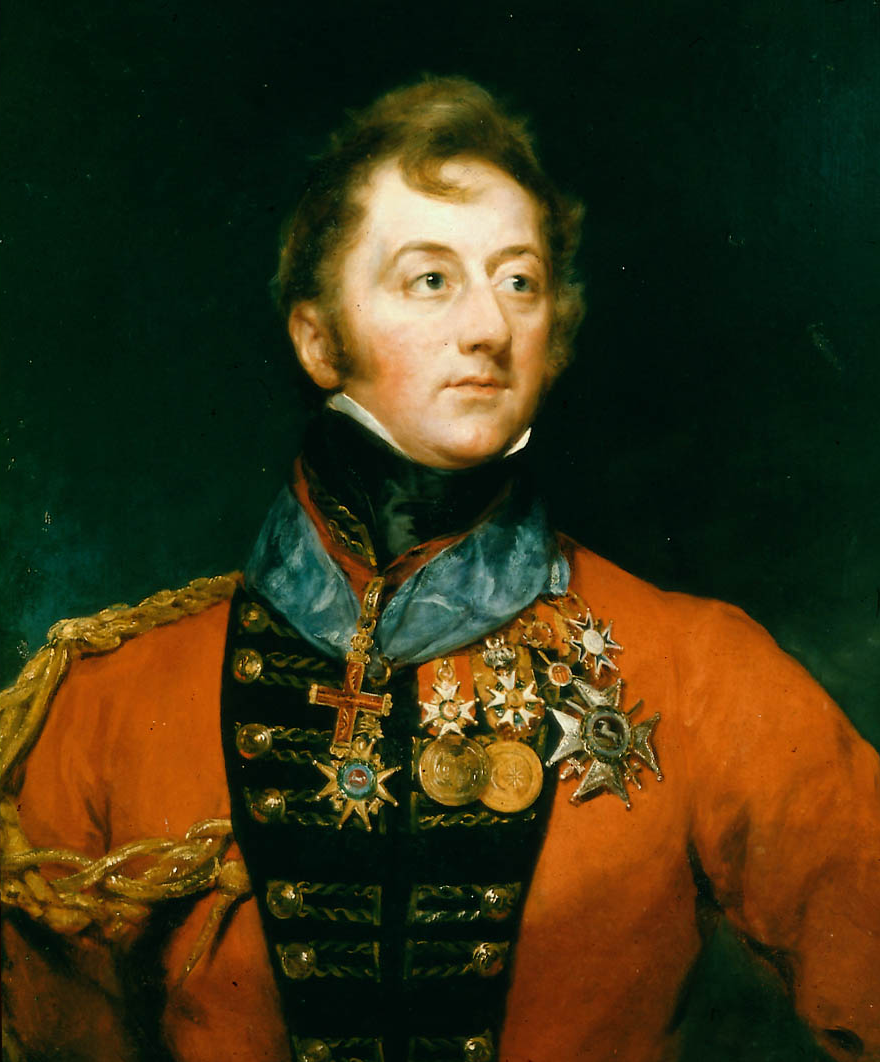
- Portrait by Margaret Sarah Carpenter, 1824
- Born: 1770; Bramblestown, County Kilkenny, Ireland
- Died: 25 October 1842 (aged 71–72); Paris, France
- Burial place: Père Lachaise Cemetery, Paris
- Military career
- Allegiance: United Kingdom
- Branch: British Army
- Rank: Lieutenant-General
- Awards: Companion of the Order of the Bath; Knight Commander of the Royal Guelphic Order (1821); Knight Grand Cross of the Royal Guelphic Order (1839)

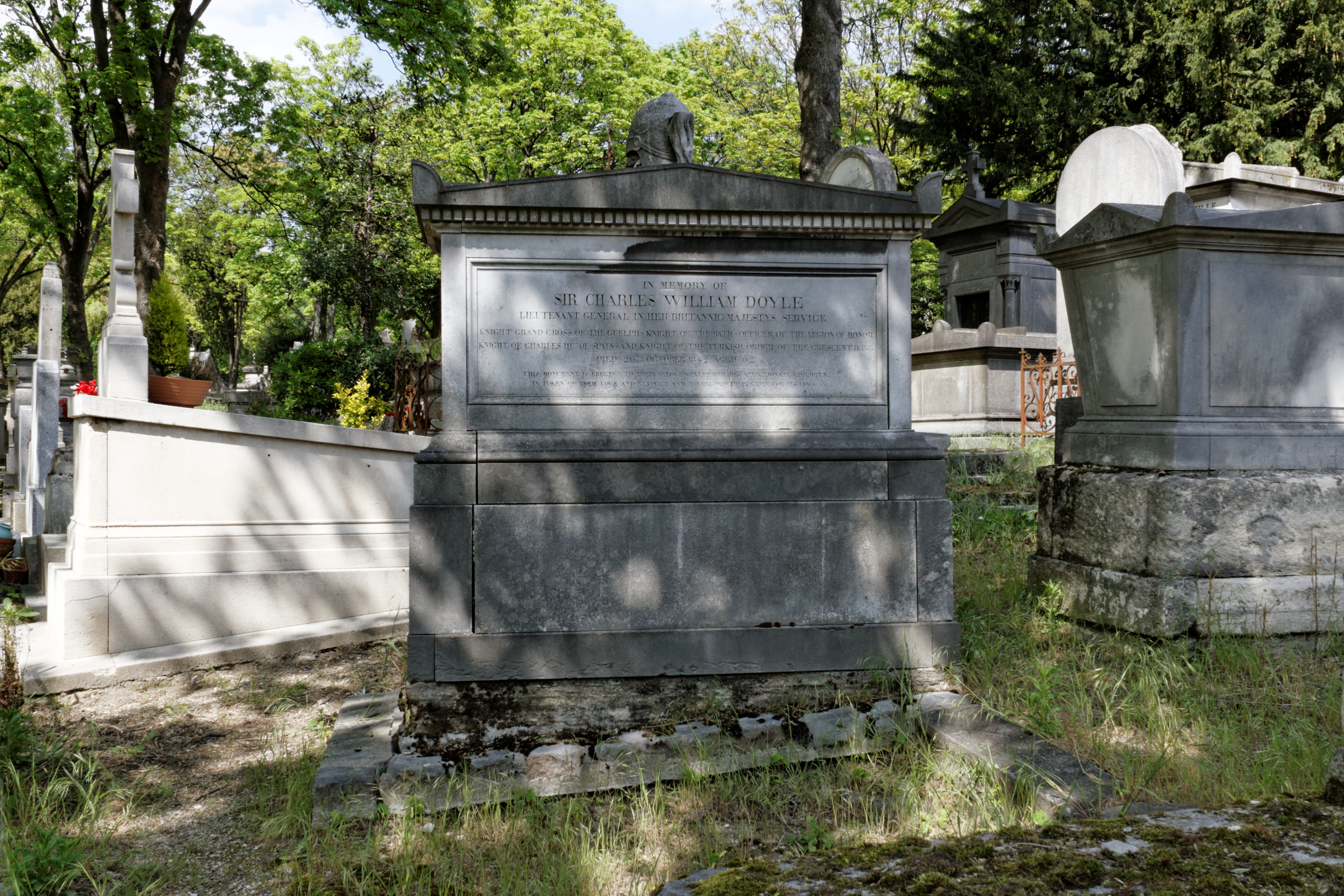
Doyle's tomb in Père Lachaise Cemetery

Lieutenant-General Sir Charles William Doyle, GCH, CB (1770 – 25 October 1842) was a British Army officer who served during the Napoleonic Wars.

== Biography ==
Doyle was born in 1770, the eldest son of William Doyle of Bramblestown, County Kilkenny, KC and master in chancery in Ireland. William Doyle was the eldest son of Charles Doyle of Bramblestown, and therefore elder brother of General Sir John Doyle, 1st Baronet. and General Welbore Ellis Doyle.

Doyle entered the army as an ensign in the 14th Foot, which was commanded by his uncle, Welbore, on 28 April 1783, and was promoted lieutenant on 12 February 1793, in which year he accompanied his regiment to the Netherlands. The 14th Foot was one of the 'ragged' regiments which Harry Calvert compares in his Letters to Falstaff's soldiers, but Major-General Ralph Abercromby soon got them into better condition, in which task he was helped by Doyle, whom he appointed his brigade-major. Abercromby's brigade was conspicuous for its efficiency throughout the ensuing campaigns. With the regiment, Doyle was present at the Battle of Famars, where his uncle, Welbore, led the attack at the head of the 14th Foot to the tune of Ça ira, an incident described in his cousins Sir F. H. Doyle's spirited poem, reprinted in his Reminiscences. Doyle was publicly thanked by Abercromby for carrying a redoubt in the heights above Valenciennes, and then acted as orderly officer to the Austrian generals during the siege of that town, when he was wounded in the head.

Doyle's next service was at the Battle of Lannoy, where he acted as aide-de-camp to Abercromby, and was wounded in the hand, and he was selected to take the despatch announcing the battle to the Duke of York. At the close of the campaign he was transferred to the adjutancy of the 91st Foot, and in June 1794 he purchased the captain-lieutenancy and adjutancy of the 105th Foot, from which he soon exchanged into the 87th Foot, commanded by his uncle, John. He accompanied this regiment to the West Indies in 1796, and acted first as brigade-major and then as aide-de-camp to Abercromby, whose public thanks he received in 1797 for covering the embarkation of the troops from the Puerto Rico, as also those of the Governor of Barbados in 1798 for having in an open boat with only thirty soldiers driven off a dangerous French privateer, and retaken two of her prizes. He was recommended for a majority, but in vain, and in the following year, after acting as brigade-major at Gibraltar, he was again recommended for a majority, but the governor's recommendation arrived just two days too late.

Doyle threw up his staff appointment to serve in the expedition to Den Helder in 1799, but was again too late, and he was immediately afterwards appointed a brigade-major to the army, sailing under Abercromby for the Mediterranean. He was attached to Lord Cavan's brigade, and was present with it at Cádiz and Malta, and finally in Egypt, where he served in the battles of Abukir, Mandara, and Alexandria, in the latter of which he was severely wounded. While lying wounded at Rosetta he learned from some wounded French prisoners that the garrison of Cairo was weak, and by giving timely information to General Lord Hutchinson, he insured the fall of that city. He was heartily thanked by Hutchinson, and again recommended, for the fifth time, for a majority, which however he did not receive until after the conclusion of the Peace of Amiens, on 9 July 1803. In the same year he was appointed brigade-major to Sir James Henry Craig, commanding the eastern district. In 1804 he first commanded the volunteers and directed the defences of Scotland, for which he was thanked by General Sir Hew Dalrymple; he then commanded the light infantry on Barham Downs, and published his Military Catechism, and was at the close of the year appointed assistant quartermaster-general in Guernsey. On 22 August 1805 Doyle was promoted lieutenant-colonel into his uncle's regiment, the 87th, and commanded it for three years during Sir John Doyle's lieutenant-governorship of that island.

In 1808 the government determined not only to send troops to Portugal, but also to send ammunition and money, and above all British officers, to the help of the insurgents in Spain. Napier censures this proceeding, but acknowledges the military ability of many of the British officers, among whom Doyle was the most distinguished. Doyle's mission was at once political and military, and he was instructed first to arm and discipline as many Spanish troops as he could, and secondly to try to reconcile the various Spanish leaders. His first services in the field were performed in Galicia, but he was soon transferred to Catalonia and the east coast of Spain.

In the campaign of 1810 Doyle had two horses killed under him; in 1811 he was wounded in the knee in the battle of the Coll de Balaguer; in honour of his services in the defence of Tortosa he was begged to add the arms of the city to his own; he received a special medal for leading the assault upon the tower and battery of Begur; he got a convoy safely into Figueres, and was wounded in the gallant defence of Tarragona. For these great services he was made a Spanish lieutenant-general at the special request of the juntas of Catalonia, Valencia, and Aragon, and was presented with two gold crosses for his defence of Tarragona and for his six actions in Catalonia. His light infantry, which was known as Doyle's 'Triadores', was in particular distinguished in every battle, and general regret was expressed when Doyle was ordered home in 1811. On his way home he was stopped by Sir Henry Wellesley at Cádiz, and begged by him to take command of the camp which was being formed in order to organise a new army of the south. He consented, and remained with the title of director and inspector-general of military instruction, and had a whole brigade ready for the field in a fortnight after the formation of the camp. These services were greatly praised in Sir Henry Wellesley's despatches, and on 4 June 1813 Doyle was appointed an aide-de-camp to the Prince Regent, and promoted to the rank of colonel in the British Army. He continued in Spain until the end of the war in 1814, but in the distribution of honours which followed he was unable to obtain the distinction of Knight Commander of the Order of the Bath, because he did not have the gold cross and clasp for commanding a regiment or being on the staff in five general actions.

Doyle was, however, made a Knight Bachelor and appointed a Companion of the Order of the Bath, and was allowed to wear the Spanish Order of Charles III. In 1819 he was promoted major-general, made colonel of the 10th Royal Veteran battalion, and created a Knight Commander of the Royal Guelphic Order. From 1825 to 1830 Doyle commanded the south-western district of Ireland; in 1837 he was promoted lieutenant-general, and in 1839 he was made a Knight Grand Cross of the Royal Guelphic Order. He died at Paris on 25 October 1842, leaving by his first wife, Sophia, daughter of Sir John Coghill, 1st Baronet, three sons: Charles Hastings, John Sydney (both also army officers) and Percy William, a diplomat. He was buried at Père Lachaise Cemetery.
