= Gordon Wilson (British Army officer) =

British Army general

Lieutenant-General Sir Gordon Wilson KCSI CB CBE MC
- Born: 1 February 1887; Edmonton, London, England
- Died: 17 July 1971 (aged 84); London, England
- Military career
- Allegiance: United Kingdom
- Branch: British Army
- Service years: 1911–1946
- Rank: Lieutenant-General
- Service number: 26271
- Unit: Royal Army Medical Corps
- Conflicts: First World War; Second World War
- Awards: Knight Commander of the Order of the Star of India; Companion of the Order of the Bath; Commander of the Order of the Bath; Military Cross ☆Mentioned in Dispatches

Lieutenant-General Sir Gordon Wilson, KCSI, CB, CBE, MC (1 February 1887 – 17 July 1971) was a British surgeon in the Royal Army Medical Corps, sometime Honorary Surgeon to the King and Director, Medical Services in India.

== Career ==
Wilson was commissioned into the Royal Army Medical Corps on 27 January 1911 as a lieutenant. During World War I, he was awarded the Military Cross.

He was promoted to colonel on 1 May 1938 and in 1939 he went to France with the British Expeditionary Force and served as Commandant in Dieppe. After the evacuation in 1940, he was appointed Deputy Director of Medical Services with X Corps from 17 July 1940, with the acting, then temporary, rank of brigadier. He relinquished this post on 22 September 1941 and was appointed as the Deputy Director of Medical Services of the Southern Army, India with the permanent rank of major general. He was promoted to the local rank of lieutenant general on 1 June 1943 and, at about the same time, became Director of Medical Services of the Southern Army.

Between 1941 and 1946, Wilson was also Honorary Surgeon to the King (KHS).

Wilson retired on 20 June 1946 as an honorary lieutenant general.

== Awards and decorations ==
- Knight Commander of the Star of India (13 June 1946)
- Companion of the Order of the Bath (8 June 1944)
- Commander of the Order of the British Empire (11 July 1940)
- Officer of the Order of the British Empire (4 June 1928)
- Military Cross
- Mention in Despatches (26 June 1940)

== Bibliography ==
- Smart, Nick (2005). Biographical Dictionary of British Generals of the Second World War. Barnesley: Pen & Sword. ISBN 1844150496.
