= Thomas Mansell (Royal Navy officer) =

British Royal Navy rear admiral

Rear-Admiral Sir Thomas Mansell KCH
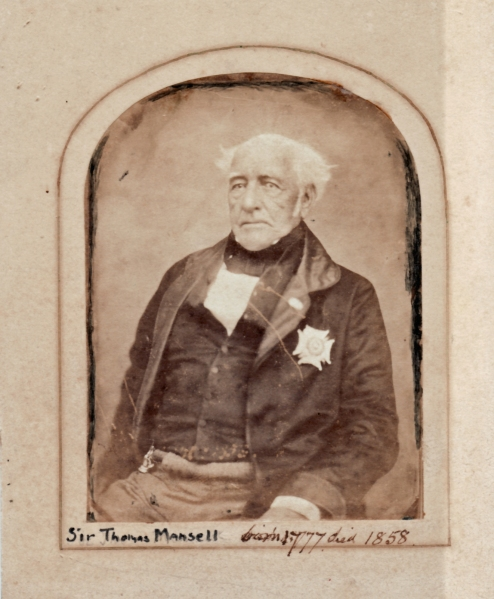
- Born: 9 February 1777
- Died: 1858 (aged 80–81)
- Occupation: Royal Navy Rear-Admiral

Sir Thomas Mansell KCH (9 February 1777 – 1858) was a British Royal Navy rear admiral.

== Biography ==
Mansell son of Thomas Mansell of Guernsey, was born on 9 February 1777. He entered the navy in January 1793, on board the Crescent frigate with Captain James Saumarez, whom he followed to the Orion, in which he was present in Lord Bridport's action off Lorient, at the battle of Cape St. Vincent, and the battle of the Nile; after which he was promoted by Nelson to be acting-lieutenant of the Aquilon, a promotion which was confirmed by the admiralty to 17 April 1799. He subsequently served in the Channel and on the French coast, and at the reduction of the Cape of Good Hope, whence he was sent home by Sir Home Popham in command of an armed transport. He was flag-lieutenant to Sir James Saumarez in the Diomede, Hibernia, and Victory, and on 17 September 1808 was promoted to the command of the Rose sloop, in which he took part in the capture of Anholt in the Baltic, 18 May 1809, and was at different times engaged with the Danish gunboats. In 1812 he was presented by the emperor of Russia with a diamond ring, in acknowledgment of his having piloted a Russian squadron through the Belt; and by the king of Sweden with the order of the Sword, 'in testimony of the esteem in which he held his services. In 1813 Mansell commanded the Pelican on the north coast of Spain, and on 7 June 1814 was advanced to post rank. It is stated that while in command of the Rose and Pelican he captured at least 170 of the enemy's vessels, some of them privateers of force. In 1837 he was nominated a K.C.H. and knighted. On 9 October 1849 he became a rear-admiral on the retired list, and died in the early summer of 1858. In 1806 he married Catherine, daughter of John Lukis, a merchant of Guernsey, and by her had issue four daughters and four sons. These latter all entered the Navy or Marines. The second, Arthur Lukis, for some years commanded the Firefly, surveying ship, in the Mediterranean, and died, a retired vice-admiral, in 1890.
