= Wiltshire Wilson =

British Army officer (1762–1842)

Lieutenant-General Sir Wiltshire Wilson KCH
- Born: 1762; Northumberland, England
- Died: 8 May 1842 (aged 79 or 80); Cheltenham, Gloucestershire, England
- Military career
- Allegiance: United Kingdom
- Branch: British Army
- Service years: 1779–c. 1825
- Rank: Lieutenant-General
- Unit: Royal Artillery
- Conflicts: French Revolutionary Wars; Flanders Campaign; Quiberon Invasion; War of the Second Coalition; Napoleonic Wars; War of the Third Coalition

Lieutenant-General Sir Wiltshire Wilson KCH (bapt. 27 March 1762 – 8 May 1842) was a general officer of the British Army who served in the Royal Artillery for some forty-five years, including several campaigns of the Revolutionary and Napoleonic Wars.

== Biography ==
He was born in 1762, the second son of Major Wiltshire Wilson of Wollock Grange, Northumberland, formerly of the 1st Royal Dragoons, and a daughter of Ralph Phillips of Colchester. After passing through the Royal Military Academy at Woolwich, Wilson received a commission as second lieutenant in the Royal Artillery on 9 July 1779.

Wilson went to the West Indies in 1780. He was promoted to lieutenant on 28 February 1782. From the West Indies he took a detachment of artillery to Canada in 1786, and in 1790 he returned to England. He served in the Duke of York's Flanders Campaign in 1793, and was for some time attached with two 6-pounder guns to the 53rd Foot. He was employed in May, June, and July at the Siege of Valenciennes, which capitulated on 28 July. He was dangerously wounded at the initial attack on Dunkirk on 24 August.

In October he was thrown into Nieuport with his two guns in company with the 53rd Foot and two Hessian battalions, where they were attacked by the whole French army under General of Brigade Dominique Vandamme. Vandamme met with an obstinate resistance, the sluices were opened, and his siege batteries inundated, and when abandoning the regular attack he attempted a night assault on 25 October, his front was so limited between the river and the inundation that Wilson, with his two guns placed to command the enemy's approach, was able by firing rapidly into the advancing foe over one hundred rounds of grape and round shot, to create such fearful havoc that the French withdrew just at the critical time when enlarged gun-vents and distorted muzzles were rendering Wilson's guns useless. The arrival of British forces on 29 October caused Vandamme to raise the siege on the following day, leaving his battering guns behind. The successful defence was ascribed by all concerned to the artillery and the 53rd Foot. Wilson's services were rewarded by promotion to the rank of captain-lieutenant, on 1 November 1793. In consequence of the gallantry displayed by the fishermen of Nieuport, the Duke of York incorporated them into a company of artillery, and gave the command of it to Wilson in June 1794.

Wilson took part in the Battle of Tournay on 23 May 1794. He commanded the artillery at the defence of Nieuport that year, when General Diepenbrook with 1,500 men held the French army of 40,000 men under General of Brigade Jean Victor Marie Moreau at bay for nineteen days. On the capitulation Wilson became a prisoner of war, and was not exchanged for nine months. He commanded the Royal Artillery in the Quiberon Expedition under Major-General Welbore Ellis Doyle in 1795. Shortly after the capture of Isle Dieu he returned to England.

In 1796 he was promoted to captain and went to the Cape of Good Hope with a company of artillery, but returned home the following year. In May 1798 he was part of the Ostend Expedition under Major-General Sir Eyre Coote, where he was again taken prisoner and sent to Lille. He was exchanged in 1799. In 1800 he was sent to the West Indies, where he remained for five years, in the last three of which he commanded the artillery. He commanded the artillery at the capture of Saint Lucia on 22 June 1803, of Tobago on 30 June 1803, and of Surinam on 5 May 1804. While in the Indies, he was promoted to the brevet rank of major on 29 August 1802, to regimental major on 20 July 1804, and to lieutenant-colonel on 10 March 1805.

On his return to England in 1806, Wilson commanded the Royal Artillery in the Northern District until 1810, when he went to Ceylon to command his regiment there. While there, he was given the brevet rank of colonel in 1813, and the substantive rank the following year. He returned home in 1815, and two years afterwards went to Canada, where he commanded the Royal Artillery until 1820. While in Canada, he was promoted to major-general on 12 August 1819. He was appointed colonel-commandant on 21 January 1828, and promoted to lieutenant-general on 10 January 1837. His services were rewarded in 1836 by the distinction of a Knight Commandership of the Royal Guelphic Order (as typical for Knight Commanders of the order, he was also made a Knight Bachelor). He died on 8 May 1842 at Cheltenham. (Note: In 1900 there was a black-and-white portrait of Wilson in the Royal Artillery Institution at Woolwich (Vetch 1900, p. 151).)

== Family ==
Wilson was twice married: first in 1789, to a daughter of John Lees; and secondly in 1825, to a daughter of Jacob Glen of Chambly, near Montreal. There was no children from either marriage.
