= Walter Tremenheere =

General Walter Tremenheere KH
- Born: 10 September 1761; Penzance, Cornwall
- Died: 7 August 1855 (aged 93); Portman Square, London
- Burial place: Kensal Green Cemetery
- Military career
- Allegiance: United Kingdom
- Branch: Royal Marines
- Service years: 1779–1838
- Rank: General
- Commands: Chatham Division
- Conflicts: American Revolutionary War; Fourth Anglo-Dutch War; Battle of Dogger Bank; French Revolutionary War; Battle of Martinique; Invasion of Guadeloupe; Napoleonic Wars; Battle of Cape Ortegal
- Awards: Knight of the Royal Guelphic Order

General Walter Tremenheere KH (10 September 1761 – 7 August 1855) was a senior officer in the Royal Marines. Born in 1761, he joined the Marines in 1779 as a first lieutenant and served in the American Revolutionary War and Fourth Anglo-Dutch War, in which he fought at the Battle of Dogger Bank in 1781 before going on half pay in 1783. He returned to service in 1790 serving on the frigate HMS Proserpine on the Jamaica Station and fought at the Battle of Martinique and Invasion of Guadeloupe in 1794. He was promoted to captain in 1796 and afterwards joined the ship of the line HMS Sans Pareil, from which he was sent to become lieutenant-governor of Curacoa Island in 1800. He served as such for two years before returning home to England at the Peace of Amiens.

After the Peace he joined the ship of the line HMS Caesar and fought on board her at the Battle of Cape Ortegal in 1805. After this he joined the newly formed Woolwich Division of Royal Marines and slowly received further promotion, becoming a colonel in 1830. He then served as an aide de camp to King William IV in the following year and became colonel commandant of the Chatham Division, a position he held until 1837. He retired from active service in 1838 but continued to be promoted, becoming a general in 1854. He died at the age of 93 in 1855.

== Early life ==
Walter Tremenheere was born at Penzance on 10 September 1761. He was the third son of William Tremenheere, a lawyer whose family had been established in Cornwall since around the reign of Edward I, and Catharine Borlase, a niece of William Borlase. He went to school in Truro.

== Military career ==
Tremenheere joined the Royal Marines on 12 January 1779 as a first lieutenant, during the American Revolutionary War. He served at sea for the following three years, including fighting at the Battle of Dogger Bank in 1781. He was placed on half pay in 1783 when the war ended. Tremenheere spent his time engaging in the social life to be found in Penzance, where his family still lived. He remained on half pay until 1790, when he was recalled to serve on the frigate HMS Proserpine. In that ship he sailed to the Jamaica Station, the first of many stints serving in the Caribbean.

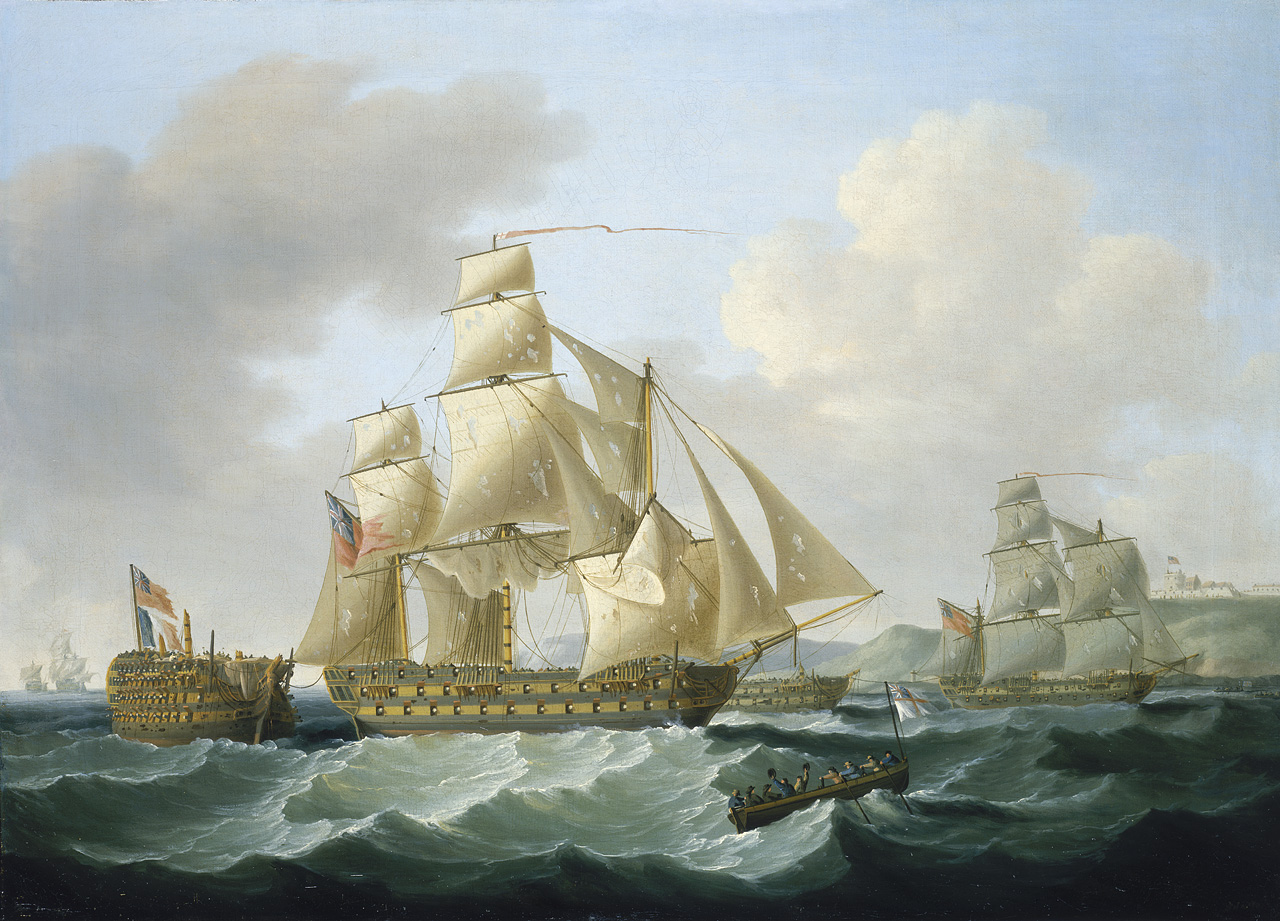
The aftermath of the Battle of Cape Ortegal; Tremenheere was serving on HMS Caesar pictured in the centre

In 1794, still a lieutenant, he commanded a detachment of marines that fought at the Battle of Martinique and the Invasion of Guadeloupe; in the latter battle his unit was key in capturing the strongpoint of Fort Fleur d'Épée. He was then promoted to captain in 1796 and from around 1799 served on board the ship of the line HMS Sans Pareil. He was made lieutenant-governor of Curacoa Island, that island having recently been captured by the forces of Vice-Admiral Lord Hugh Seymour of which Tremenheere was a part of, on 17 October 1800. Tremenheere served as co-governor of the island with the previous Dutch occupant of that position. As neither man was senior to the other there was often great confusion in the giving of orders and in the control of the island. To further difficulties, Seymour quarrelled with the army's Major-General Sir Thomas Trigge over who Tremenheere owed subordination to, he being an anomalous Royal Marine. Trigge attempted to replace him as lieutenant-governor with Lieutenant-Colonel William Carlyon Hughes, but Tremenheere refused to give up his position to him. Under orders from Seymour he focused his time on the island on attempting to install a sense of Britishness on the foreign population, it being expected that the islands would stay under their control. In 1801 Seymour died, giving the upper hand to Trigge who finally succeeded in installing Hughes and removing Tremenheere in 1802.

Tremenheere returned home to England to get married when the Peace of Amiens began in the same year. When the Peace ended in 1803 he was assigned to serve on the ship of the line HMS Caesar in the Channel Fleet. Tremenheere was still serving in Caesar in 1805, and as such fought at the Battle of Cape Ortegal in November. This was his last official service at sea, and later in the year he joined the permanent Royal Marines staff of the Woolwich Division. He received brevet rank as a major in 1808. He was confirmed as a major in 1812, promoted to lieutenant-colonel in 1814, and colonel in 1830. On 28 December of that year he was made an aide de camp to King William IV, the first Royal Marine to hold that position. He was appointed colonel commandant of the Chatham Division of Royal Marines in 1831, and while serving as such he was created a Knight of the Royal Guelphic Order on 18 June 1832. In 1835 he was offered the post of Governor of Bermuda, which he declined. He left his Chatham command in 1837 and retired from active military service in the following year. He was promoted to major-general in 1841, lieutenant-general in 1851, and general on 28 November 1854.

== Death ==
Tremenheere died at the age of 93 on 7 August 1855 at his house at 33 Somerset Street, Portman Square, London. He was buried at Kensal Green Cemetery.

== Family ==
Tremenheere married Frances Apperley, the daughter of Thomas Apperley of Wrexham, on 29 March 1802. They had four sons and two daughters, including:

- Hugh Seymour Tremenheere CB JP FGS (1804–1893), a publicist and author
- John Henry Tremenheere (b. 1807), barrister and fellow of the Royal Statistical Society
- Major-General George Borlase Tremenheere JP (1809–1896), an officer of the Bombay Engineers
- Lieutenant-General Charles William Tremenheere CB (1813–1898), an officer of the Bombay Engineers and later Royal Engineers
