= David Tinling-Widdrington =

British Army general

Lieutenant-General Sir David Tinling-Widdrington KCH
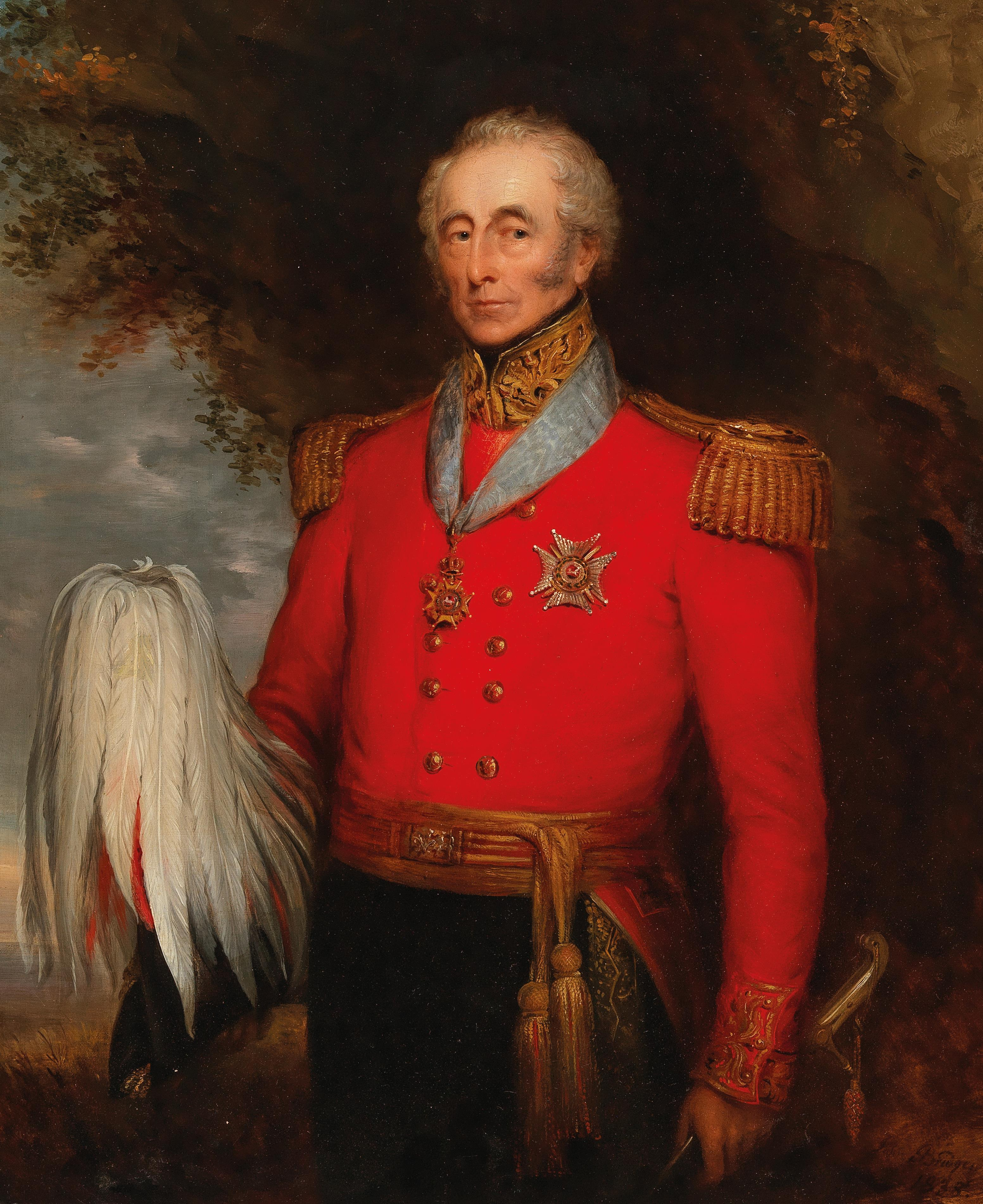
- Portrait by John Bridges, 1838
- Born: David Latimer Tinling; 1758; Gibraltar
- Died: 30 July 1839 (aged 80–81); Bexley, Kent
- Spouse: Sarah Teasdale (m. 1784)
- Military career
- Allegiance: United Kingdom
- Branch: British Army
- Service years: 1779–1839
- Rank: Lieutenant-General
- Commands: 17th Regiment of Foot
- Conflicts: American Revolutionary War; Great Siege of Gibraltar; French Revolutionary Wars; Haitian Revolution; Anglo-Russian Invasion of Holland; Napoleonic Wars

Lieutenant-General Sir David Latimer Tinling-Widdrington KCH (1758 – 30 July 1839) was a senior officer in the British Army. His surname was originally Tinling, but he adopted Tinling-Widdrington on marrying his wife Sarah Teasdale in 1784, who was a co-heiress to the estates of her uncles John and Nathaniel Widdrington. However, in 1809 he was granted permission to have his children styled as simply Widdrington.

He joined the Army in 1777, serving at Gibraltar, in the West Indies, Flanders and at Menorca; he commanded a battalion of the 17th Foot. He finished his active service in Gibraltar. He was promoted Lieutenant General 27 May 1825. He was awarded KCH and in 1833 and knighted. He died on 30 July 1839 in his son's house in Bexley, Kent and was buried in the graveyard at St Mary's Church, Bexley. His eldest son was Major George John Widdrington who died of wounds received at the Battle of Vitoria in 1813, in northern Spain, aged 26.
