= Royal Guelphic Order =

Hanoverian order of chivalry

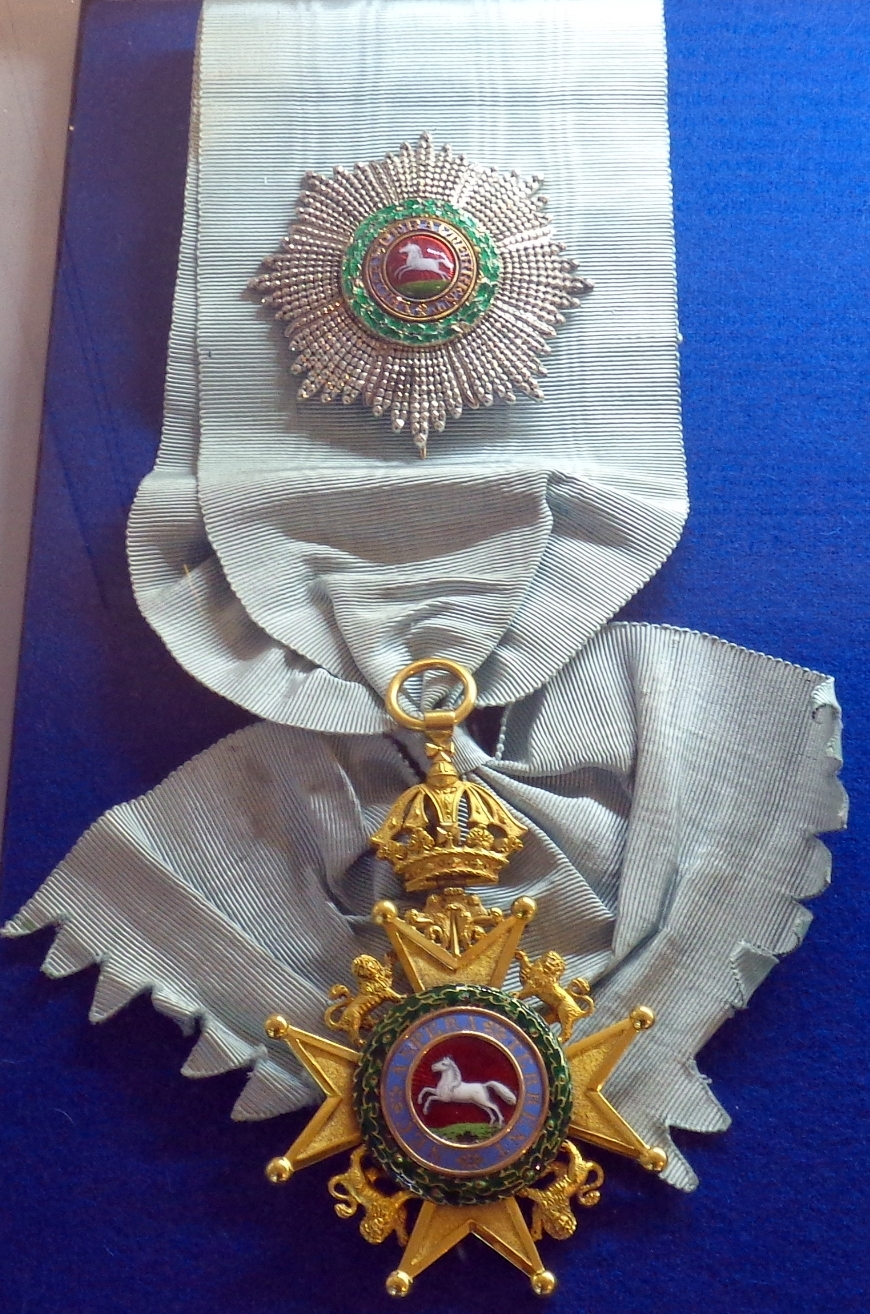
- Grand cross star, sash and badge of the Royal Guelphic Order (Civil Division)

Awarded by Kingdom of Hanover
- Type: House Order
- Established: 28 April 1815
- Motto: Nec Aspera Terrent (Not afraid of difficulties)
- Sovereign: Ernst August
- Grades: After 1841; Grand Cross; Commander 1st Class; Commander 2nd Class; Knight; Cross of Merit
- Former grades: Original; Knight Grand Cross; Knight Commander; Knight

Precedence
- Next (higher): Order of Saint George
- Next (lower): Order of Ernst August
- Ribbon of the order

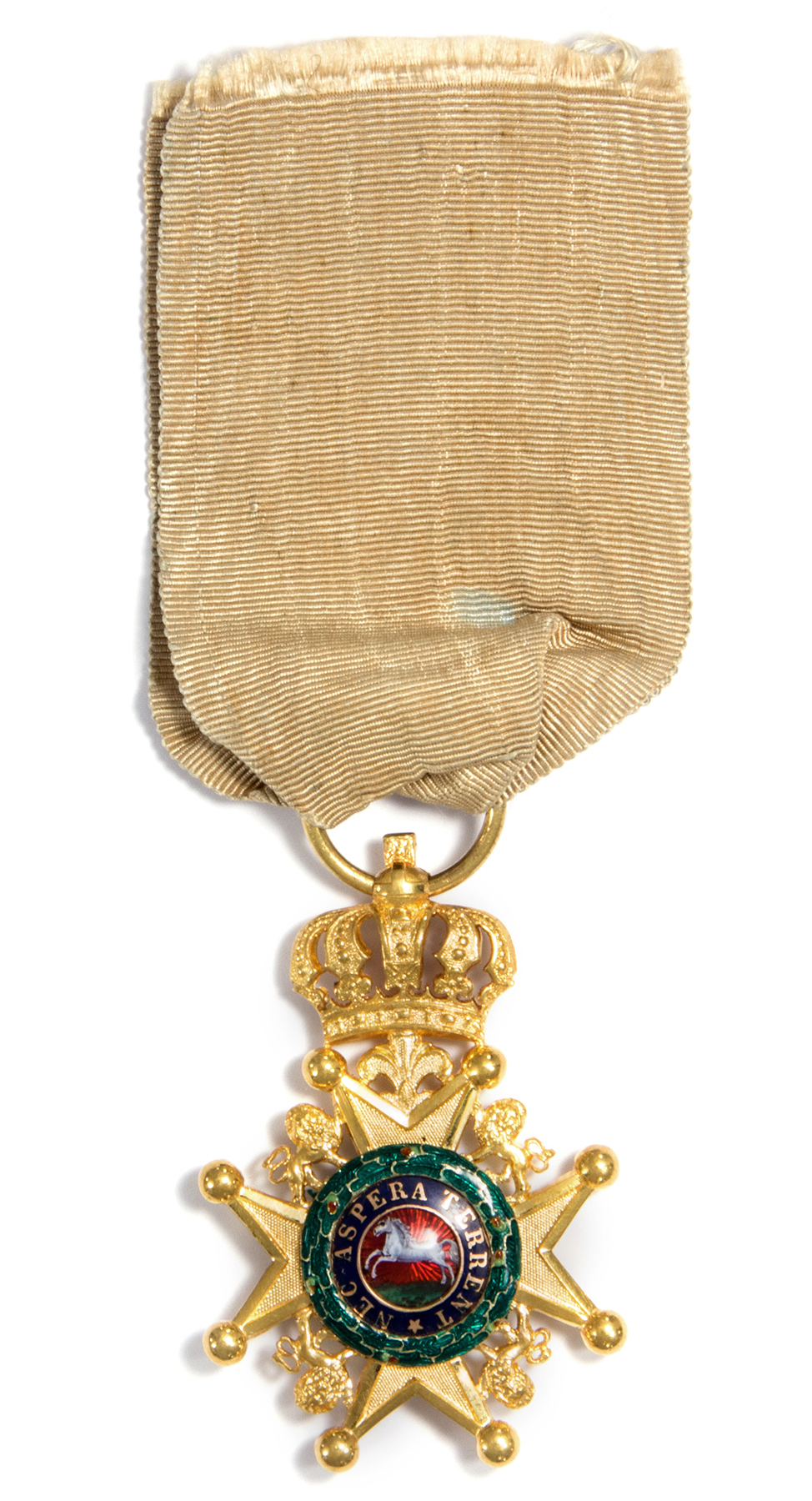
Badge of the Royal Guelphic Order

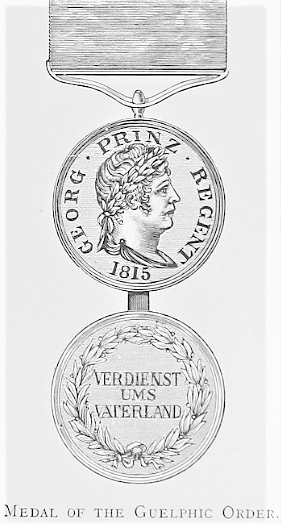
Medal of the Order

Flag of the Electorate of Hanover, 1692

The Royal Guelphic Order (German: Königlicher Guelphen-Orden), sometimes referred to as the Hanoverian Guelphic Order, is a Hanoverian order of chivalry instituted on 28 April 1815 by the Prince Regent (later King George IV). It takes its name from the House of Guelph, of which the House of Hanover was a branch. Since Hanover and the United Kingdom shared a monarch until 1837, the order was frequently bestowed upon British subjects.

== History ==
The order was created to commemorate the 100th anniversary of the accession to the British throne of the House of Hanover.

Until 1837 the order was frequently awarded to officers in the British Navy and Army, although it was still classed as a foreign order, with British members of the order not entitled to style themselves as "Sir" unless they were also created Knights Bachelor, as many were.

The British link ended in 1837 when Hanover's royal union with Great Britain ended, with Ernest Augustus becoming King of Hanover and Queen Victoria ascending the British throne. When Hanover was annexed by the Kingdom of Prussia in 1866, the order continued as a house order to be awarded by the Royal House of Hanover. Today, its current Sovereign is the Hanoverian head of the house, Ernst August, Prince of Hanover.

== Classes ==
The insignia was based on the white horse on Hanover's arms.

The Order includes two divisions, Civil and Military, the latter indicated by crossed swords on both the badge and star. It originally had three classes, but with several reorganisations since 1841, as house order today it has four classes and an additional Cross of Merit. In descending order of seniority the classes are:

=== 1815–1841 ===
- Knight Grand Cross (GCH). Received a collar chain and badge, a star worn on the left breast, and a badge worn from sash over the right shoulder.
- Knight Commander (KCH). A neck badge worn from a ribbon, with a breast star, smaller than that for the GCH.
- Knight (KH). Wore the badge on the left breast. Versions in both gold and silver were awarded.

Holders of the respective degrees of the order in Britain were entitled to be post-nominally addressed with the initials, which stand for Knight Grand Cross of Hanover, Knight Commander of Hanover and Knight of Hanover. The initial GCG was also used, and was cited in the original statutes of the order.

Gold and silver medals were attached to the order, for award to those not eligible for the order itself, including non commissioned officers and royal servants.

=== After 1841 ===
- Grand Cross
- Commander 1st Class
- Commander 2nd Class
- Knight
- Cross of Merit

== The order ==
=== Officers ===
The Order has six officers: the Chancellor, the Vice-Chancellor, the Registrar, the King of Arms, the Genealogist, and the Secretary.

==== Officers until 1837 ====
The first six officers were:

- Chancellor: Count Ernst Friedrich Herbert von Münster
- Vice-Chancellor: Georg Nieper
- Secretary: Ludwig Moeller
- King of Arms: Sir George Nayler
- Genealogist: August Neubourg
- Registrar: Sir William Woods

==== Officers since 1987 ====
- Chancellor: Ernst August, Prince of Hanover

=== Members ===
- List of knights grand cross of the Royal Guelphic Order
- List of knights commander of the Royal Guelphic Order

List of knights of the Royal Guelphic Order
- Charles Ashe à Court-Repington
- Charles Babbage
- Lovell Benjamin Badcock
- William Stanhope Badcock
- Henry Bayly (British Army officer, born 1790)
- Charles Bell
- George Frederick Beltz
- William Brereton (British Army officer)
- David Brewster
- Samuel Brown (Royal Navy officer)
- George Brown (British Army officer)
- Thomas Bunbury (British Army general)
- James Burnes
- Ryder Burton
- Nicholas Carlisle
- James Charles Chatterton
- Robert Alexander Chermside
- Thomas Henry Shadwell Clerke
- Abraham Josias Cloëté
- William Colebrooke
- John Cowell-Stepney
- Henry John Cumming
- Augustus De Butts
- Edward Cromwell Disbrowe
- Wilhelm von Dörnberg
- William Granville Eliot
- William Henry Elliott
- Henry Ellis (librarian)
- Richard England (British Army officer, born 1793)
- Mathias Everard
- Arthur Farquhar (Royal Navy officer, born 1772)
- Alexander Findlay (British Army officer)
- Charles Augustus FitzRoy
- Charles Fergusson Forbes
- William Forster (British Army officer)
- James Freeth
- Robert Garrett (British Army officer)
- George Gawler
- Johann Karl Ludwig Gieseler
- Charles Stephen Gore
- Gideon Gorrequer
- Gottlieb Graf von Haeseler
- Andrew Halliday (physician)
- Henry Hanmer
- Jakob von Hartmann
- Graves Haughton
- William Havelock
- Andrew Leith Hay
- William Henderson (Royal Navy officer)
- William Herschel
- John Herschel
- Felton Hervey-Bathurst
- John Hindmarsh
- William Jackson Hooker
- William Hotham (Royal Navy officer, born 1794)
- John Hobart Caradoc, 2nd Baron Howden
- Frederick Irwin
- James Ivory (mathematician)
- James Jackson (British Army officer)
- William Jervois (British Army officer)
- Love Jones-Parry (British Army officer)
- Heinrich Kirchweger
- Charles Konig
- Joseph de Courcy Laffan
- Henry John Leeke
- John Leslie (physicist)
- Henry Frederick Lockyer
- Edmund Lodge
- Frederick Love
- Alexander Maconochie (penal reformer)
- Frederic Madden
- Charles Menzies (Royal Marines officer)
- Samuel Rush Meyrick
- Charles Collier Michell
- William Taylor Money
- Sir John Murray, 8th Baronet
- George Nayler
- Robert Nickle (British Army officer)
- Nicholas Harris Nicolas
- John Owen (Royal Marines officer)
- Francis Palgrave
- George William Paty
- John Pennycuick (British Army infantry officer)
- George Dean Pitt
- Henry Riddell
- John Robison (inventor)
- John Robyns
- Sir David Scott, 2nd Baronet
- Robert Smart
- Charles Hamilton Smith
- Frederick Smith (British Army officer, born 1790)
- Henry Somerset (British Army officer)
- John Spink
- Thomas Staunton St Clair
- Joseph Thackwell
- Edward Thomason
- Walter Tremenheere
- George Tyler (Royal Navy officer)
- James Maxwell Wallace
- George Wetherall
- Edward Charles Whinyates
- Charles Wilkins
- Frederick von Wissell
- William Woods (officer of arms)

== See also ==
- Hanoverian Waterloo Medal
- Order of Ernst August
- Order of St. George (Hanover)
