= Clatterbridge Cancer Centre NHS Foundation Trust =

UK public sector healthcare provider

The Clatterbridge Cancer Centre NHS Foundation Trust

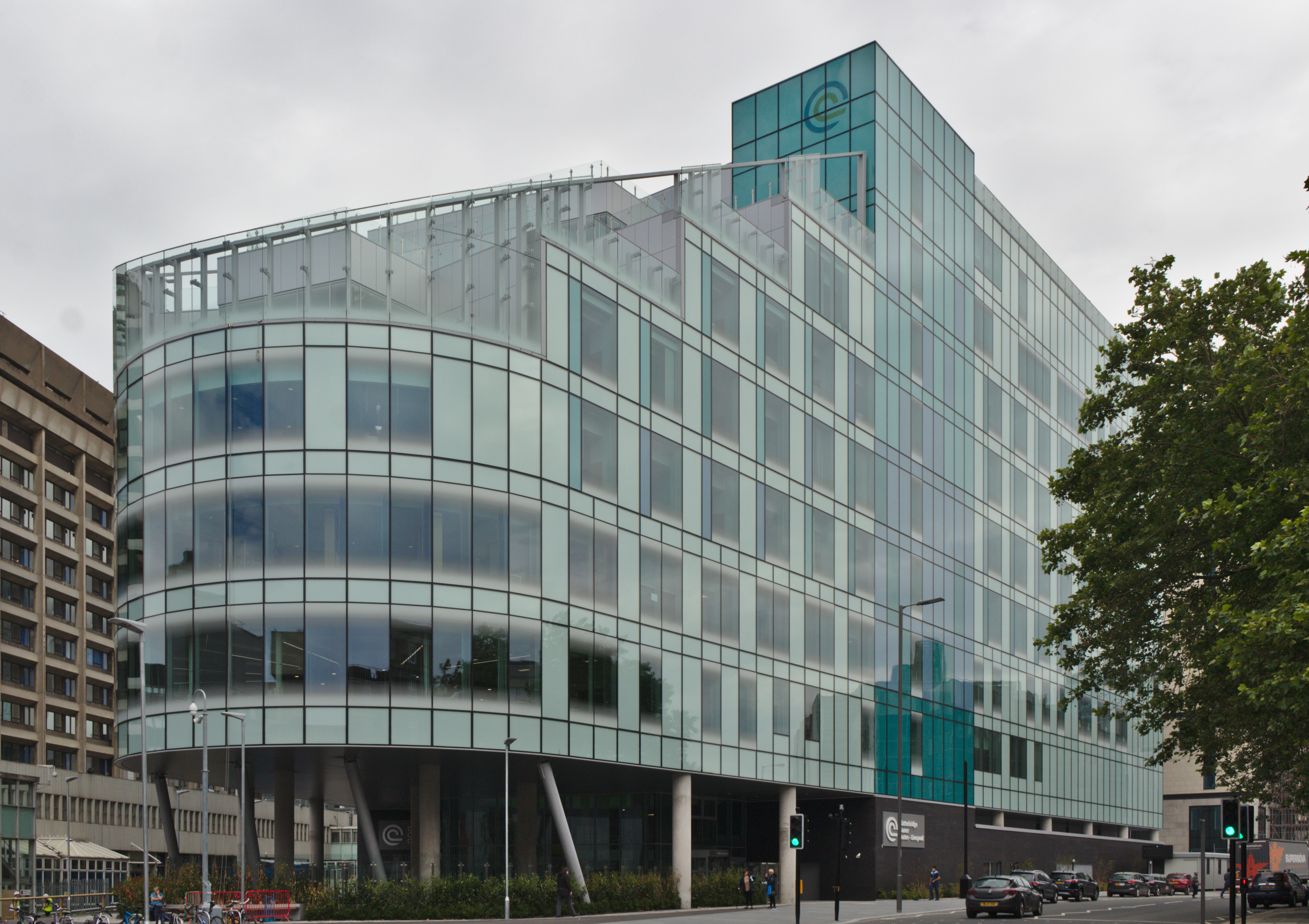
- Clatterbridge Cancer Centre Liverpool
- Type: NHS Foundation Trust
- Established: 1 August 2006
- Headquarters: The Clatterbridge Cancer Centre, Bebington, Wirral (Clatterbridge health park)
- Hospitals: Clatterbridge Cancer Centre Liverpool (Liverpool); Clatterbridge Cancer Centre Wirral (Clatterbridge Health Park, Wirral); Clatterbridge Cancer Centre Aintree (Aintree University Hospital site, Fazakerley)
- Chair: Kathy Doran
- Chief executive: Liz Bishop
- Website: www.clatterbridgecc.nhs.uk

The Clatterbridge Cancer Centre is an NHS Foundation Trust, which specialises in the treatment of cancer. The centre is one of several specialist hospitals located within Merseyside; alongside Liverpool Heart and Chest Hospital, Alder Hey Children's Hospital, Liverpool Women's Hospital, and the Walton Centre.

Currently headquartered at Clatterbridge Health Park, Bebington, Wirral, the Trust operates an extensive network of services across Cheshire and Merseyside which includes their three sites in Liverpool, Wirral and Aintree, as well as clinics in hospitals across the region, and its team of specialist nurses who treat patients while they're at home or work.

== History ==
In 1862 the Liverpool Hospital for Cancer and Diseases of the Skin was established. This hospital moved to a new site and became The Radium Institute and by 1901 was one of the two major radiotherapy centres in the North West of England.

In 1950s the organisation was renamed The Liverpool Clinic and in March 1958 moved to a new site near Clatterbridge, Wirral. The hospital had three wards and by 1959 was treating up to 80 patients per day on a Mullard 4 MeV linear accelerator. In the 1960s superficial x-ray equipment was introduced, along with a second linear accelerator in 1966 and two Cobalt-60 units.

In July 1972 the hospital was expanded to include outpatient departments, computerised radiotherapy planning facilities and medical records facilities. Between 1984 and 1987 the site was again expanded to include Computer Tomography, a gamma camera and The Douglas Cyclotron. In the 1990s these were followed by MRI facilities, a High Dose Rate afterloader and additional linear accelerators.

In 2011 the Trust opened a satellite hospital on the Aintree University Hospital campus to provide more convenient radiotherapy services to Liverpool.

On 1 April 2012 the trust changed its name from Clatterbridge Centre for Oncology NHS Foundation Trust (CCO) to The Clatterbirdge Cancer Centre NHS Foundation Trust (CCC).

In 2016 the Trust established a subsidiary company, Clatterbridge PropCare Services Ltd, to which 13 estates and facilities staff were transferred. The intention was to achieve VAT benefits, as well as pay bill savings, by recruiting new staff on less expensive non-NHS contracts. VAT benefits arise because NHS trusts can only claim VAT back on a small subset of goods and services they buy. The Value Added Tax Act 1994 provides a mechanism through which NHS trusts can qualify for refunds on contracted out services.

In June 2020 the Trust opened a new 11-storey hospital building in Liverpool next to the Royal Liverpool University Hospital and University of Liverpool.

== Hospitals ==
The Trust operates three sites across Merseyside, with a number of outpatient clinics hosted in other Trusts in the area.

=== Clatterbridge Cancer Centre - Wirral ===
The main base of the trust is located on the Wirral near Bebington. It provides a range of radiotherapy and chemotherapy services along with inpatient wards. The site hosts the only low energy proton therapy unit in the United Kingdom, which provides proton beam therapy for eye tumours. One of the first NHS England funded community diagnostic centres in England is Clatterbridge Diagnostics, on the Wirral site, which offers tests for Phlebotomy, Ultrasound, MRI, CT, ECHO, ECG and Sleep Studies.

==== Clatterbridge Private Clinic ====
In June 2013, as part of a joint venture between the trust and Ireland's Mater Private Hospital, a private radiotherapy clinic was opened at the Clatterbridge Cancer Centre. The clinic provides chemotherapy, and radiotherapy treatments using a dedicated linear accelerator.

==== Maggie's Merseyside ====
In 2014 Maggie's Centres, a registered charity that provides support to anyone affected by cancer, opened Maggie's Merseyside centre.

=== Clatterbridge Cancer Centre - Aintree ===
Located on the campus of Aintree University Hospital, adjacent to The Walton Centre. The Clatterbridge Cancer Centre Aintree opened in 2011, as a radiotherapy satellite centre. At a cost of £17 million, the unit was partly funded by The Marina Dalglish Appeal. The Aintree facility provides Stereotactic Radiosurgery services in partnership with The Walton Centre.

=== Clatterbridge Cancer Centre - Liverpool ===
In 2008 a review was published into the provision of non-surgical oncology services within the Merseyside and Cheshire Cancer Network. In this review; its authors, Professor Mark Baker and Mr Roger Cannon, recommended that an inpatient cancer treatment facility be built in Liverpool. The Clatterbridge Cancer Centre Foundation Trust announced in 2011 that this recommendation was being actioned, and would take advantage of separate, but concurrent, plans for the redevelopment of the Royal Liverpool University Hospital. Approval to move forward with the plan for the new cancer hospital on West Derby Street, Liverpool was given by the eight local authorities in December 2014. This followed a public consultation, which ran from July 2014 to October 2014.

In October 2015, it was announced that the planned hospital will have 11 floors, and also include blood cancer treatment facilities. The Transforming Cancer Care project was projected to cost £155 million in total. This includes both the building and equipping of the new hospital, and refurbishing the Trust's Wirral cancer centre. It opened to inpatients on Saturday 27 June 2020 and outpatients were welcomed from Monday 29 June 2020. It has 110 fully-single en-suite patient bedrooms and five radiotherapy Linac treatment suites. Laing O'Rourke was the main contractor.

== Satellite clinics ==
To enable patients located to the north and east of the River Mersey to receive more convenient access to cancer treatment, the centre operates a number of satellite clinics within the Liverpool City Region and North West.

=== Chemotherapy ===
The trust runs chemotherapy clinics from the Marina Dalglish Centre in Aintree, CANtreat in Halton, Ormskirk Hospital, and the Lilac Centre in St Helens.

=== Outpaitent ===
They also provide outpatient clinics at other hospitals in the Cheshire and Merseyside area:

- Aintree University Hospital
- Arrowe Park Hospital
- Broadgreen Hospital
- Clatterbridge Hospital
- Countess of Chester Hospital
- Liverpool Heart and Chest Hospital
- Liverpool Women's Hospital
- Nightingale Building at Halton General Hospital
- St Helens Hospital
- The Walton Centre
- Warrington Hospital
- Whiston Hospital

=== Isle of Man ===
The centre provides both chemotherapy and outpatient services at Noble's Hospital on the Isle of Man.

== Diagnostic centres ==
The trust provides diagnostic services from two community diagnostic centres.

=== Clatterbridge Diagnostics ===
Also based on Clatterbridge Health Park, this centre is run in partnership with the neighbouring Wirral University Teaching Hospital. The centre opened 2021.

=== Paddington Community Diagnostic Centre ===
Located in Liverpool's Knowledge Quarter, the centre offers diagnostic testing and scans for a "wide range of health conditions", and not just cancer diagnosis.

== Group companies ==
The Trust owns 2 subsidiary companies - PharmaC and PropCare as well as a joint venture with Mater Private Healthcare, The Clatterbridge Private Clinic.

== Performance ==
It was named by the Health Service Journal as one of the top hundred NHS trusts to work for in 2015. 92% of staff recommend it as a place for treatment and 73% recommended it as a place to work. In March 2023, it had 1,796 full-time equivalent staff and a sickness absence rate of 4.7% compared to 4.9% average across England.

In 2019 the trust was rated as good by the Care Quality Commission dropping from an outstanding rating in 2017.

== See also ==
- List of hospitals in England
- List of NHS trusts
- Cancer in the United Kingdom
