= Birkenhead =

Town in Wirral, Merseyside, England

Coordinates: 53.393°N 3.014°W

- Town
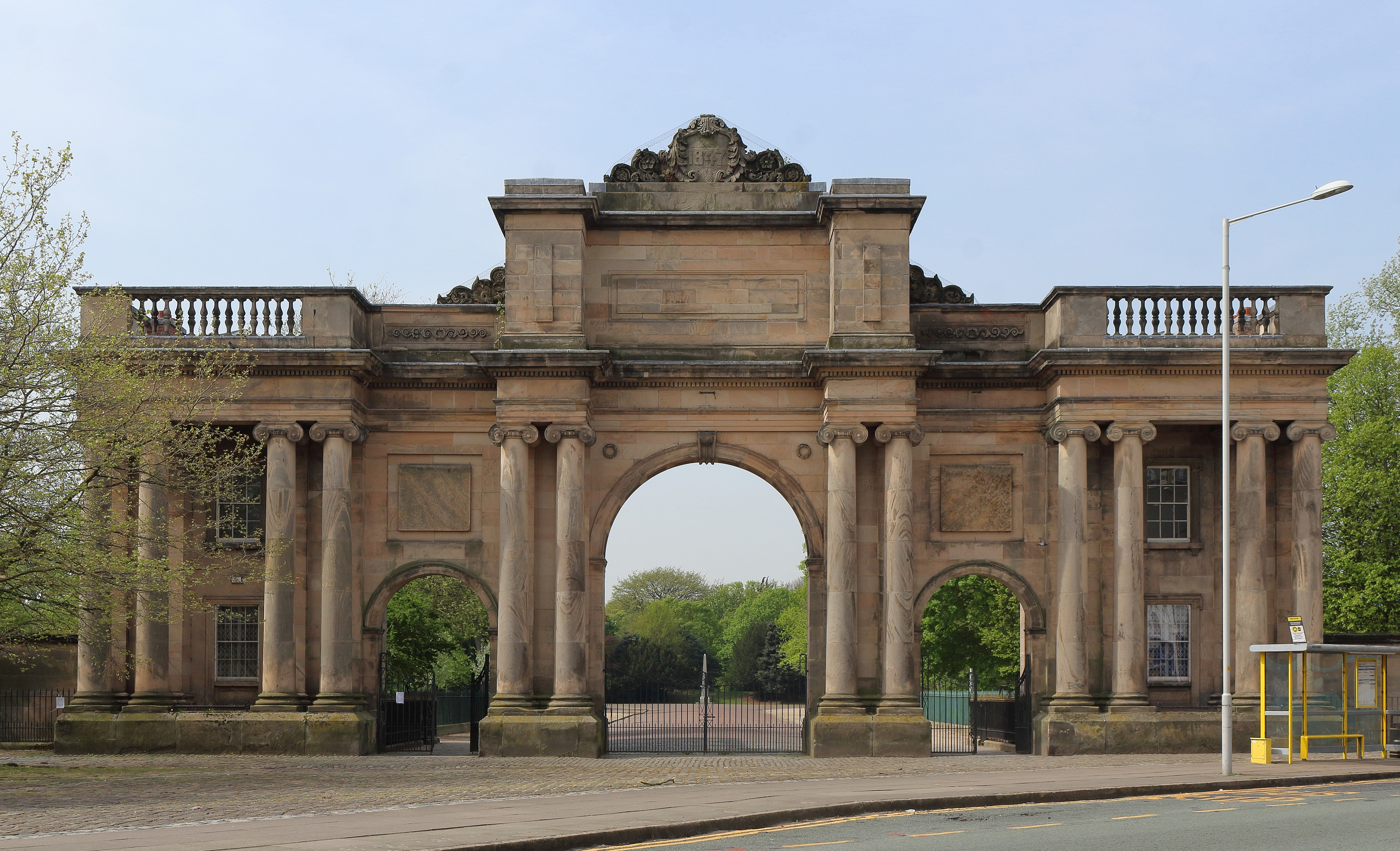
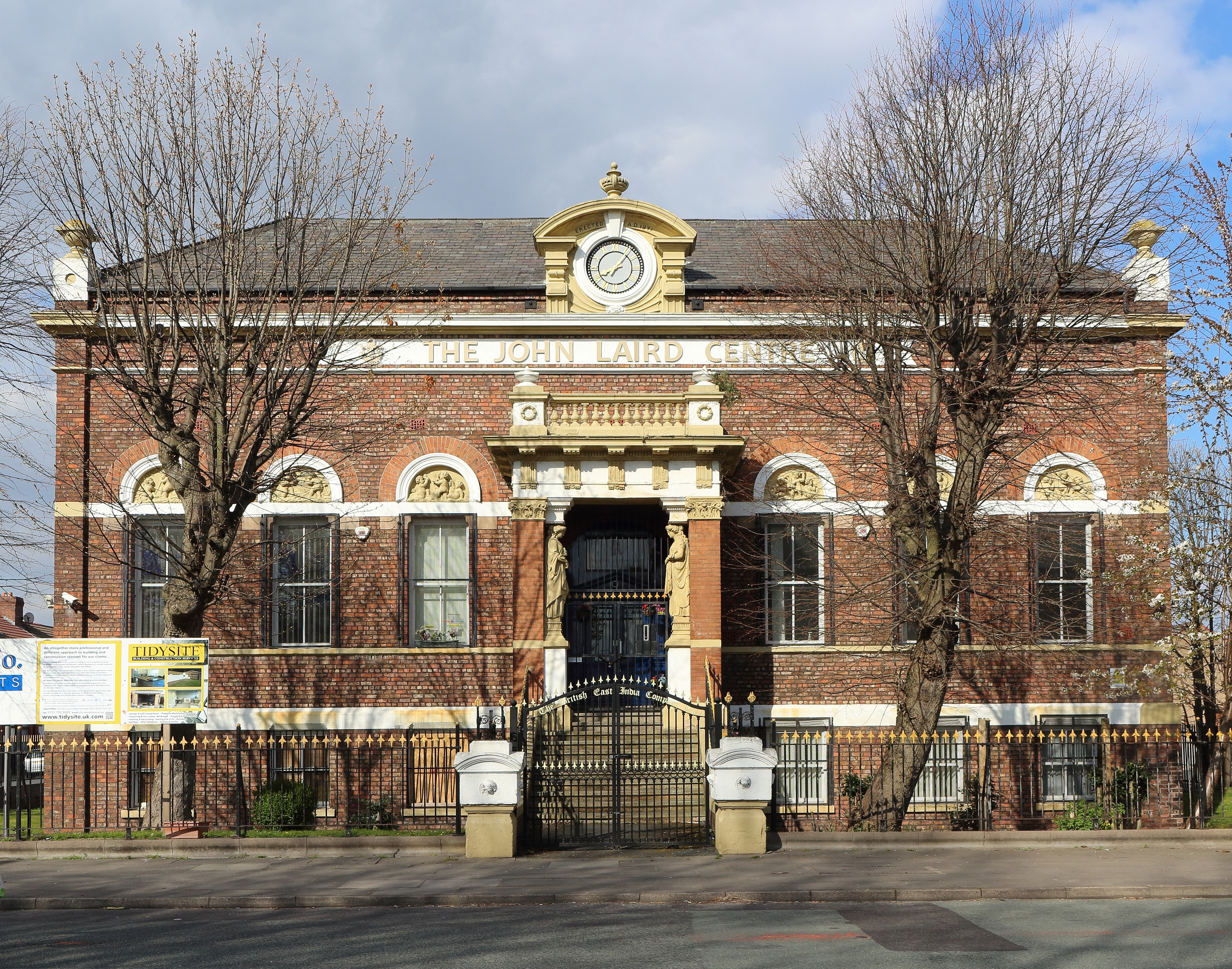
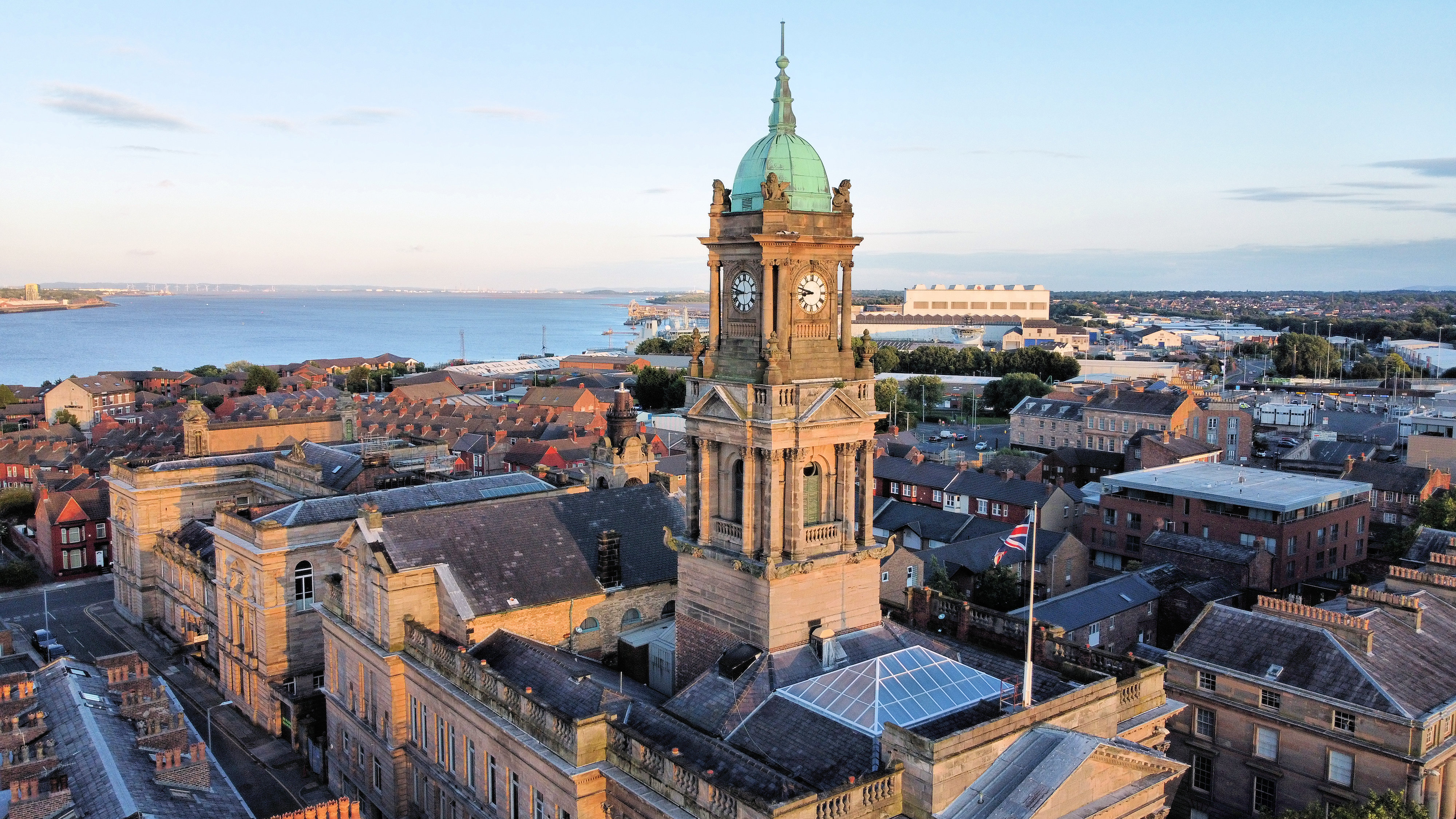
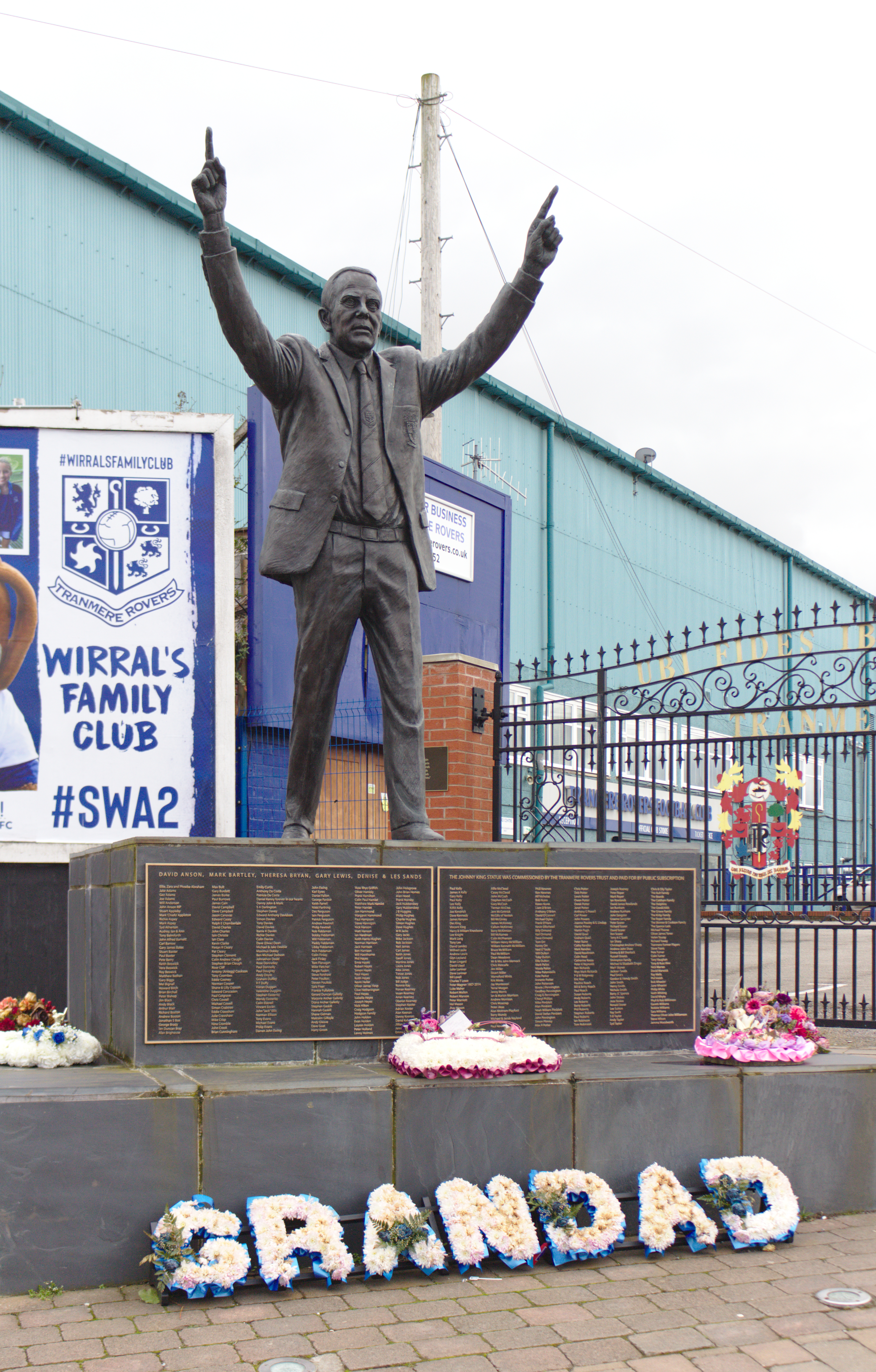
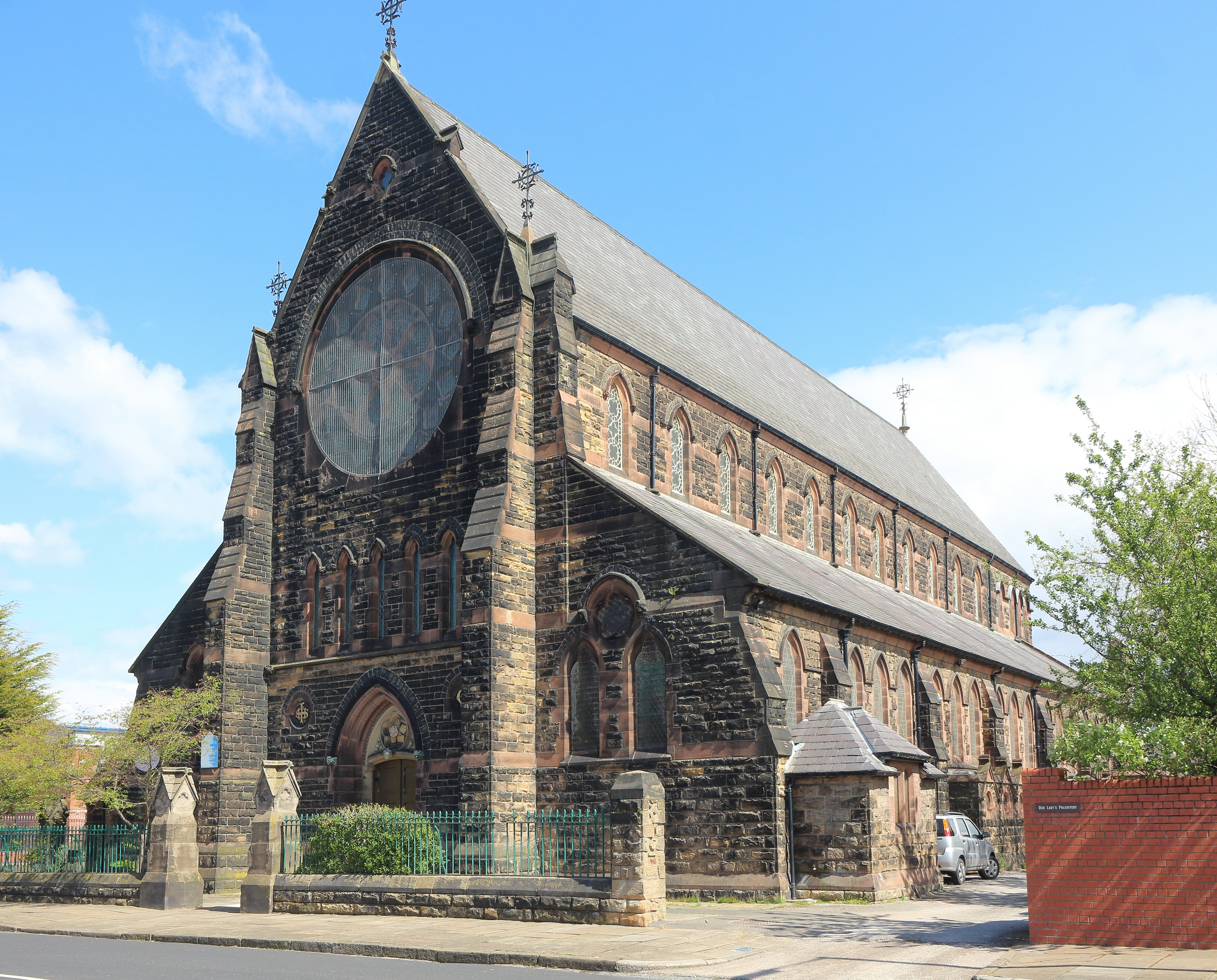
- Birkenhead Park John Laird Centre Birkenhead Town Hall in Hamilton Square Prenton Park Church of Our Lady of the Immaculate Conception

- Location within Merseyside
- Population: 109,835 (Built up area, 2021)
- Demonym: Birkonian
- OS grid reference: SJ324890
  - London: 178 mi (286 km) SE
- Metropolitan borough: Wirral
- Metropolitan county: Merseyside
- Region: North West
- Country: England
- Sovereign state: United Kingdom
- Post town: BIRKENHEAD
- Postcode district: CH41, CH42
- Dialling code: 0151
- ISO 3166 code: GB-WRL
- Police: Merseyside
- Fire: Merseyside
- Ambulance: North West
- UK Parliament: Birkenhead

Birkenhead (/ˌbɜːrkənˈhɛd/) is an industrial port town in the Metropolitan Borough of Wirral, Merseyside, England. The town is on the Wirral Peninsula, along the west bank of the River Mersey, opposite Liverpool. It lies within the historic county boundaries of Cheshire, and became part of Merseyside in 1974. At the 2021 census, the built up area as defined by the Office for National Statistics had a population of 109,835.

Birkenhead Priory and the Mersey Ferry were established in the 12th century. In the 19th century, Birkenhead expanded greatly as a consequence of the Industrial Revolution, leading to a shipbuilding firm which became Cammell Laird. A seaport was established. As the town grew, Birkenhead Park and Hamilton Square were laid out. The first street tramway in Britain was built, followed by the Mersey Railway which connected Birkenhead and Liverpool through the world's first railway tunnel beneath a tidal estuary.

In the second half of the 20th century, the town suffered a significant period of decline, with containerisation causing a reduction in port activity. The Wirral Waters development is building offices and housing on much of the former dockland.

== Toponymy ==
The name Birkenhead probably means "headland overgrown with birch", from the Old English bircen meaning birch tree, of which many once grew on the headland which jutted into the river at Woodside. The name is not derived from the Birket, a stream which enters the Mersey between Birkenhead and Seacombe; the Birket is a later name which was introduced by Ordnance Survey.

== History ==
=== Medieval period ===
The earliest records state that the Mersey ferry began operating from Birkenhead in 1150, when Benedictine monks under the leadership of Hamon de Mascy built a priory there. The priory was visited in 1275 and 1277 by Edward I. In a royal charter of 13 April 1330, Edward III granted the priory further rights.

=== 19th century ===
Distanced from the Industrial Revolution in Liverpool by the physical barrier of the River Mersey, Birkenhead retained its agricultural status until the advent of steam ferry services. In 1817 a steam ferry service started from Liverpool to Tranmere and in 1822 the paddle steamer Royal Mail began operation between Liverpool and Woodside.

Shipbuilding started in 1829. An ironworks was established by William Laird in 1824, and he was joined by his son John in 1828. The business eventually became the shipbuilder Cammell Laird. Notable naval vessels built at Birkenhead include HMS Achilles, HMS Affray, CSS Alabama, HMS Ark Royal, HMS Birkenhead, HMS Caroline, Huáscar, the pioneer submarine Resurgam, HMS Thetis (which sank in Liverpool Bay during sea trials, and was refloated and commissioned as HMS Thunderbolt, only to be lost to enemy action with the loss of the entire crew), HMS Conqueror and HMS Prince of Wales. Merchant vessels were also built such as RMS Mauretania and RMS Windsor Castle.

In 1833 an act was passed to introduce street paving, lighting and other improvements in the town. These included establishing a market and regulating the police force.

In the mid-19th century, Irish refugees fleeing the potato famine settled in large numbers in Birkenhead. Sectarian tensions between the Catholic Irish and local Protestant populations led to the Garibaldi riots of 1862.

The Mersey Railway tunnel opened in 1886, providing direct railway access to Liverpool.

=== 20th century ===
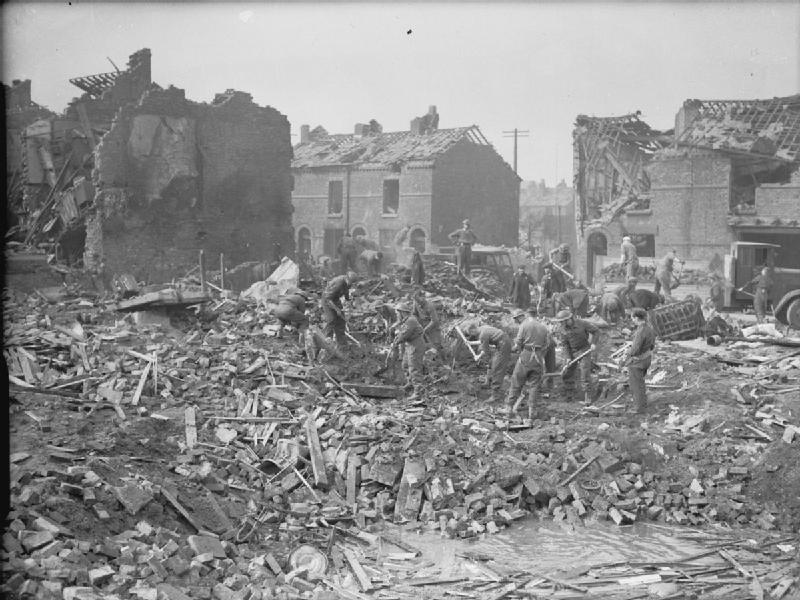
Troops of Western Command clearing up bomb damage in Birkenhead, 15 March 1941

The Grange Road West drill hall was completed in 1900.

In 1908, Robert Baden-Powell announced the launch of the Scout movement during a publicity visit to the Birkenhead branch of the YMCA; his ideas had previously led to the creation of informal Scout patrols in some parts of the country. Among the troops formed in 1908 was the 1st Birkenhead (YMCA) troop.

In September 1932 thousands of unemployed people protested in a series of demonstrations organised by the local branch of the National Unemployed Workers Movement. After three days of rioting, police were brought in from elsewhere to help quell the rioters.

In addition to the ferries and the railway, the Queensway road tunnel opened in 1934 and gave rapid access to Liverpool. This opened up the Wirral Peninsula for development, and prompted further growth of Birkenhead as an industrial centre. Bolstered by migration from rural Cheshire, southern Ireland and Wales, the town's population had grown from 110 in 1801 to 110,912 one hundred years later and stood at 142,501 by 1951.

1989 saw the completion of a large shopping development within Birkenhead town centre, known as the Pyramids.

Conway Park station was opened in 1998 as part of a development that saw Wirral Metropolitan College open a new campus nearby.

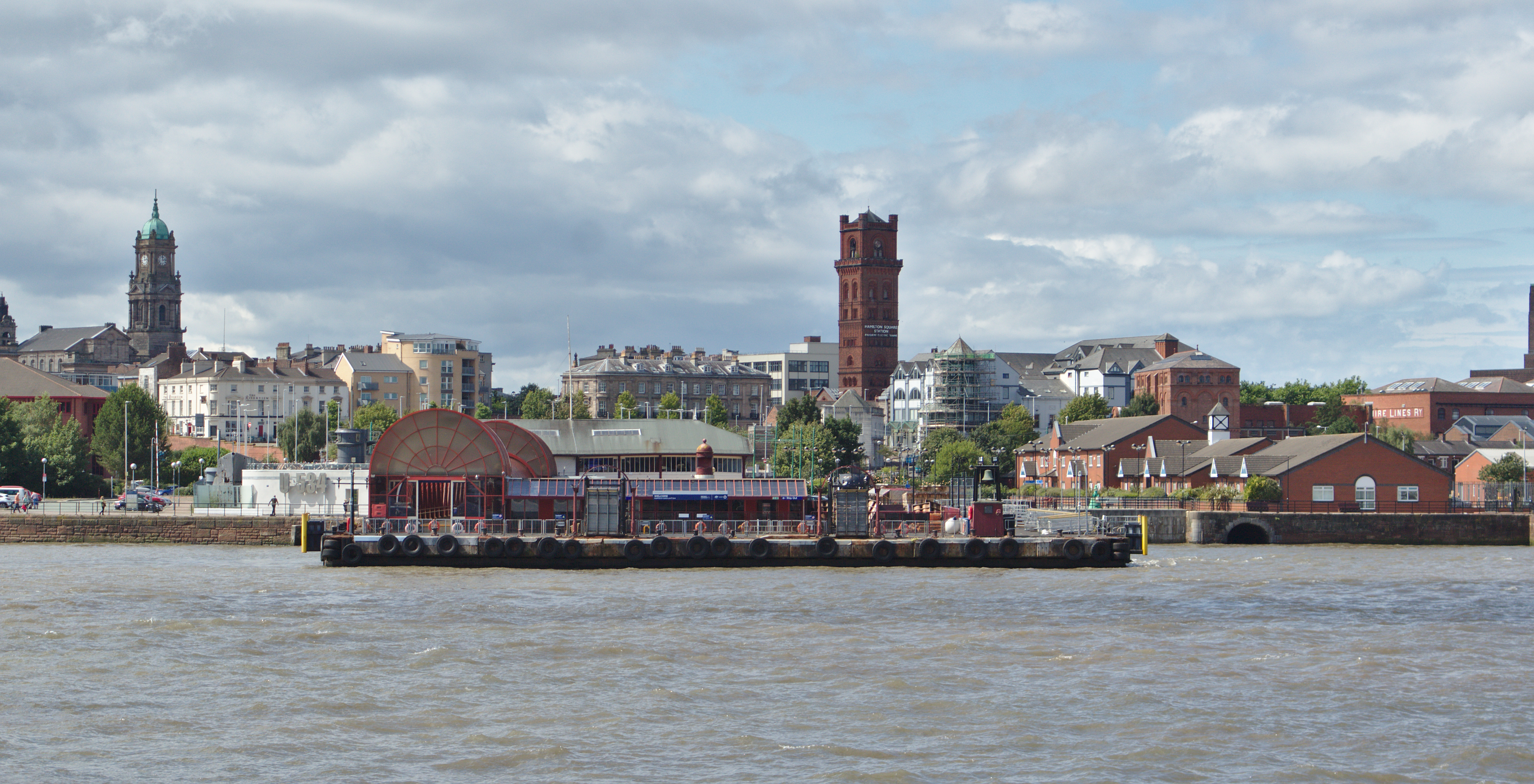
A view of Woodside from the River Mersey

=== 21st century ===
The Wirral Waters development was announced in 2006, with work starting in 2011 and expecting to last for around 30 years.

Wirral Council announced in 2020 the formulation of a 20 year development plan known as the 'Birkenhead 2040 Framework'. The plan aims to regenerate parts of Birkenhead, with the creation of a new park (Dock Branch Park), new housing and an improved greener environment.

== Governance ==
Birkenhead lies within the Metropolitan Borough of Wirral, with Wirral Council providing most local government functions. Wirral forms part of the Liverpool City Region, which is led by a directly elected Metro Mayor.

=== Administrative history ===
Birkenhead Improvement Act 1833
- Act of Parliament
- Parliament of the United Kingdom
- Long title: An Act for paving, lighting, watching, cleansing, and otherwise improving the Township or Chapelry of Birkenhead in the County Palatine of Chester, and for regulating the Police thereof, and for establishing a Market within the said Township.
- Citation: 3 & 4 Will. 4. c. lxviii

Dates
- Royal assent: 10 June 1833
Other legislation
Repealed by	Birkenhead Corporation Act 1881

Status: Repealed

Text of statute as originally enacted

Birkenhead Extension Act 1843
- Act of Parliament
- Parliament of the United Kingdom
- Long title: An Act for extending the Powers of the Commissioners of the Township of Birkenhead in the County of Chester, and for including the Township of Claughton-cum-Grange and Part of the Township of Oxton in the same County within their Jurisdiction.
- Citation: 6 & 7 Vict. c. xiii

Dates
- Royal assent: 11 April 1843
Other legislation
Repealed by	Birkenhead Corporation Act 1881

Status: Repealed

Text of statute as originally enacted

Birkenhead was historically a chapelry in the ancient parish of Bidston, which formed part of the Wirral Hundred of Cheshire. For some purposes it was deemed an extra-parochial township. As the town began to develop rapidly in the early nineteenth century, there was a need for more urban forms of local government. The Birkenhead Improvement Act 1833 (3 & 4 Will. 4. c. lxviii) set up a body of improvement commissioners covering the chapelry of Birkenhead. The commissioners' district was enlarged by the Birkenhead Extension Act 1843 (6 & 7 Vict. c. xiii) to take in the township of Claughton with Grange and part of Oxton. Local government districts were subsequently established for Tranmere in 1860 and Oxton in 1863.

In 1877 Birkenhead was incorporated as a municipal borough, with its territory covering the combined area of the old commissioners' district and the two local government districts of Oxton and Tranmere, which were abolished. The new borough also took in the Rock Ferry area from Bebington. When elected county councils were established in 1889, Birkenhead was considered large enough to provide its own county-level services, and so it was made a county borough, making it independent from the new Cheshire County Council, whilst still being deemed part of Cheshire for ceremonial purposes.

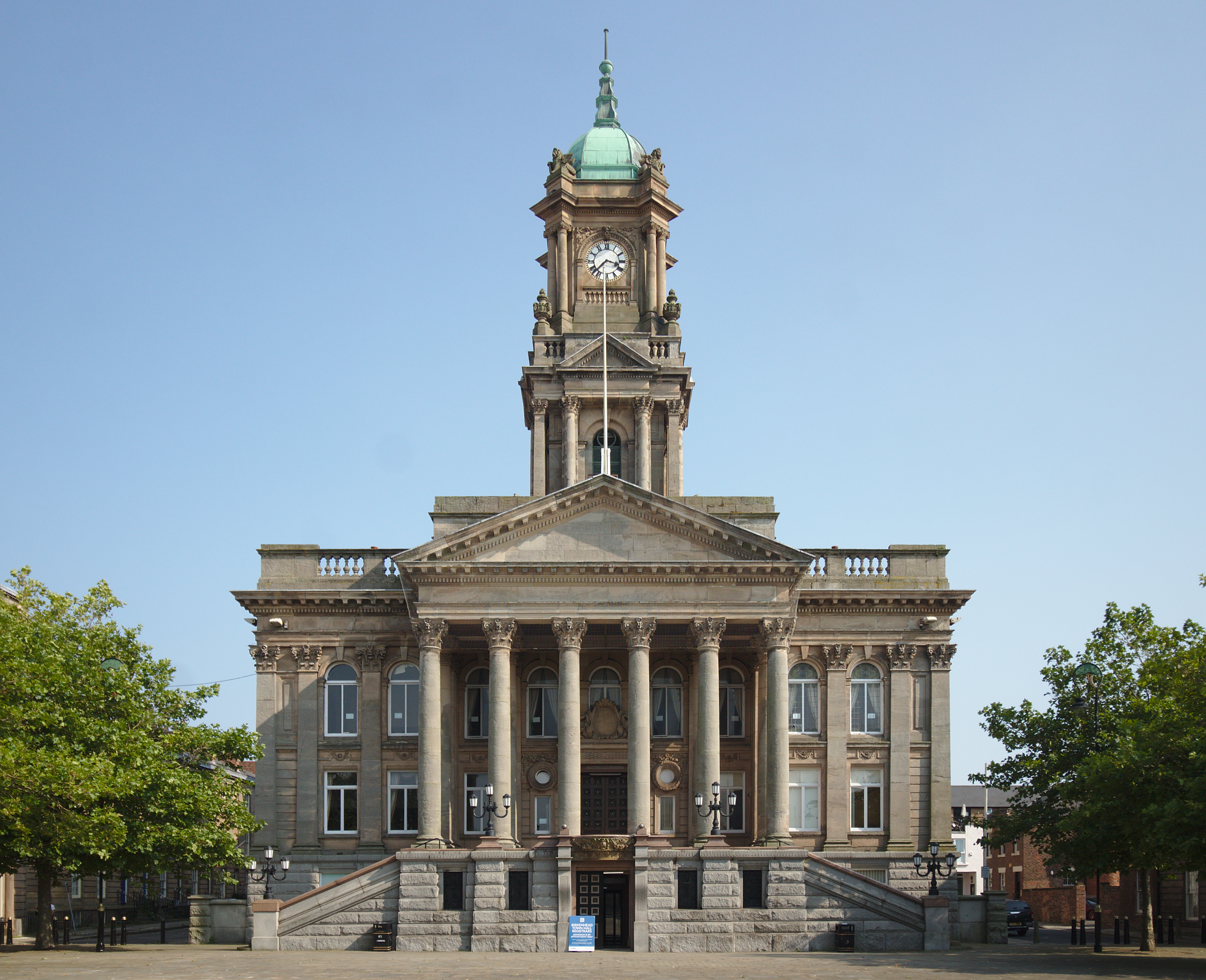
Birkenhead Town Hall, completed 1887.

The council built itself Birkenhead Town Hall on Hamilton Square to serve as its headquarters; the building was opened in 1887. The borough was enlarged in 1928 to absorb Landican, Prenton and Thingwall, and again in 1933 to take in Bidston, Noctorum, Upton and Woodchurch.

The borough of Birkenhead was abolished in 1974 under the Local Government Act 1972, with the area becoming part of the Metropolitan Borough of Wirral and being transferred to the metropolitan county of Merseyside. In 1986 Merseyside County Council was abolished, with Wirral Council then taking on the county council's former functions in the area. Since 2014 Wirral and the other Merseyside boroughs and neighbouring Halton have been covered by the Liverpool City Region Combined Authority, which has been led by a directly elected mayor since 2017.

=== Constituency ===
The constituency of Birkenhead has elected Members of Parliament from the Labour Party since its creation in 1950 when Birkenhead East and Birkenhead West were abolished. However, in 2018 Frank Field resigned the Labour whip and served the rest of the term until 2019 as an independent MP. The town has been represented by Alison McGovern since 2024.

== Geography ==
The Birkenhead Urban Area, as defined by the Office for National Statistics, includes Birkenhead, Wallasey, Bebington, Ellesmere Port (which is outside the Metropolitan Borough of Wirral) and the contiguous built-up areas which link those towns. In the 2011 Census, the area so defined had a total population of 325,264, making it the 19th largest conurbation in England and Wales.

== Economy ==
=== Shipbuilding ===
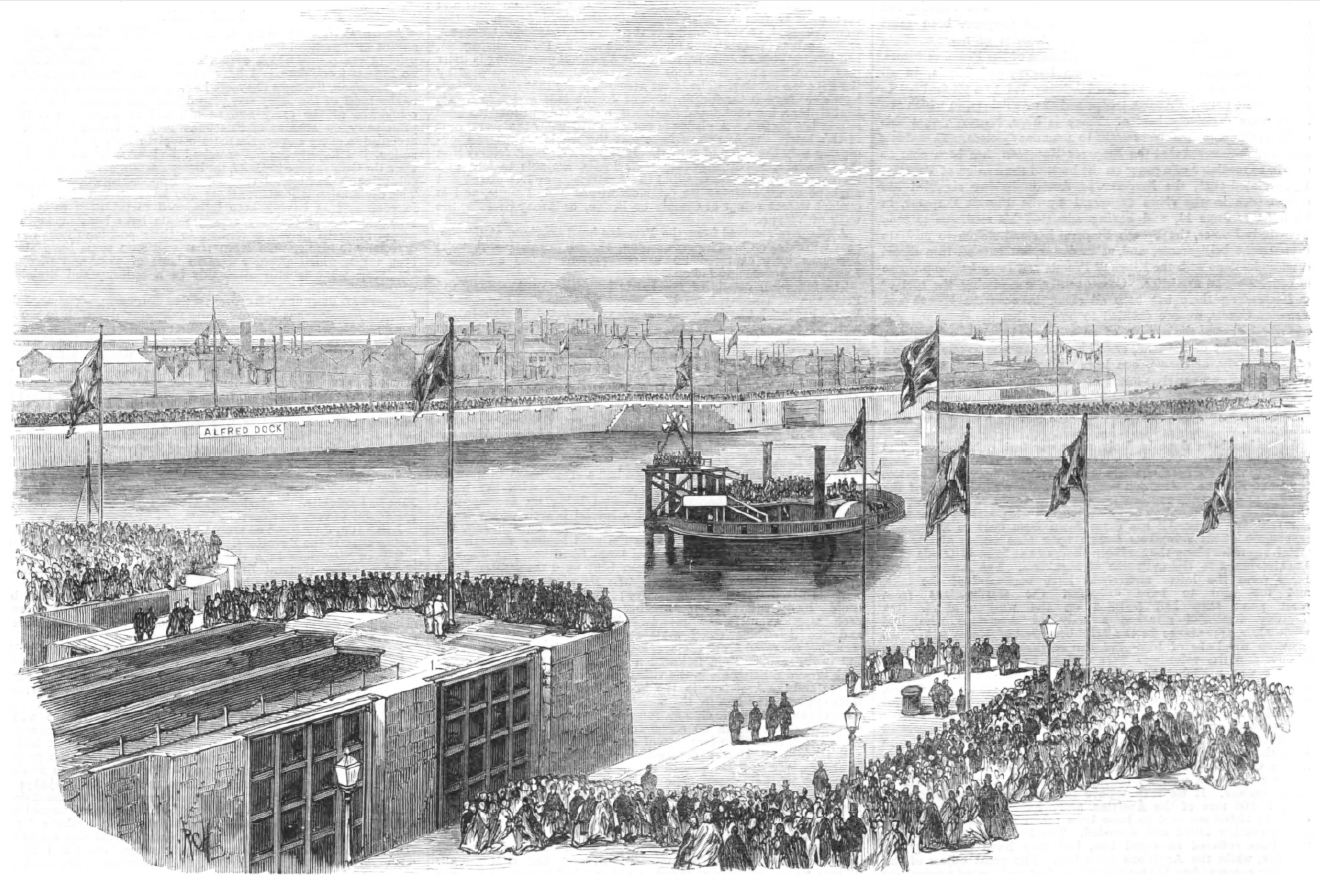
The Duke of Edinburgh opening the new entrance to the Great Northern Docks at Birkenhead, 1866

Shipbuilding and ship repair has featured prominently in the local economy since the 19th century. Cammell Laird entered receivership in 2001. The shipyard was sold and became 'Northwestern Shiprepairers & Shipbuilders' (NS&S), which grew into a successful business specialising in ship repair and conversion, including maintenance contracts for the Royal Fleet Auxiliary. In September 2007 NS&S acquired the rights to use the Cammell Laird name. The company was renamed 'Cammell Laird Shiprepairers & Shipbuilders' on 17 November 2008, seeing the famous name return to Birkenhead after a seven-year hiatus. In 2010, Cammell Laird secured a £50 million contract to construct the flight deck for HMS Queen Elizabeth, the first of two Queen Elizabeth-class aircraft carriers. In 2015, Cammell Laird was selected as the preferred bidder to construct RRS Sir David Attenborough, a Royal Research Ship.

=== Commerce ===
Birkenhead's first market was established in 1835 in a purpose-built building in Hamilton Street near its junction with Market Street. This building also contained the town hall, commissioners' offices and a lock-up. It is often said that the first market was opened on the site of the later town hall in Hamilton Square. This is untrue. In fact, part of the eastern side of Hamilton Square was deliberately left empty until 1887, when the main town hall was built on that designated site. The Hamilton Square town hall site was never used as a market, despite that myth being propagated in many accounts of Birkenhead's history, including official sources. The large market hall which was a famous feature of Birkenhead was built behind the original market, along Albion Street, opening in July 1845. This market hall was built by Fox, Henderson & Co, who later built The Crystal Palace. Michael Marks, of Marks & Spencer, opened one of his first seven 'Penny Bazaar' stalls here during the 1880s. On 31 January 2018, Marks & Spencer announced the closure of their store, in the town centre of Birkenhead, happening in April.

During the 1970s, the commercial centre of the town was redeveloped around the principal shopping area of Grange Road. Following two fires at the expanded Birkenhead Market in 1969 and 1974, it was moved to new premises adjoining the Grange Shopping Precinct development in 1977. Commercial expansion continued in the early 1990s when the Pyramids Shopping Centre was opened. The previous market site has been redeveloped with the construction of two office buildings, primarily to house Land Registry and Department for Work and Pensions offices.

=== Economic statistics ===
In February 2010, the town had an overall unemployment rate of 8.2% (males 12.4%, female 4.1%) as against a national average of 4.4%.

== Demography ==
At the 2021 census, the built up area as defined by the Office for National Statistics (ONS) had a population of 109,835.

For the previous 2011 census, the ONS identified a wider Birkenhead built up area with a population of 325,264, which comprised five built up area subdivisions called Bebington, Birkenhead (population 142,968), Ellesmere Port, Elton, and Wallasey. The Birkenhead subdivision based on the 2011 census was larger than the Birkenhead built up area based on the 2021 census; notable differences between those two definitions are that Greasby is classed as a separate urban area in 2021, and Moreton has been counted as part of the Wallasey built up area in 2021.

== Landmarks ==
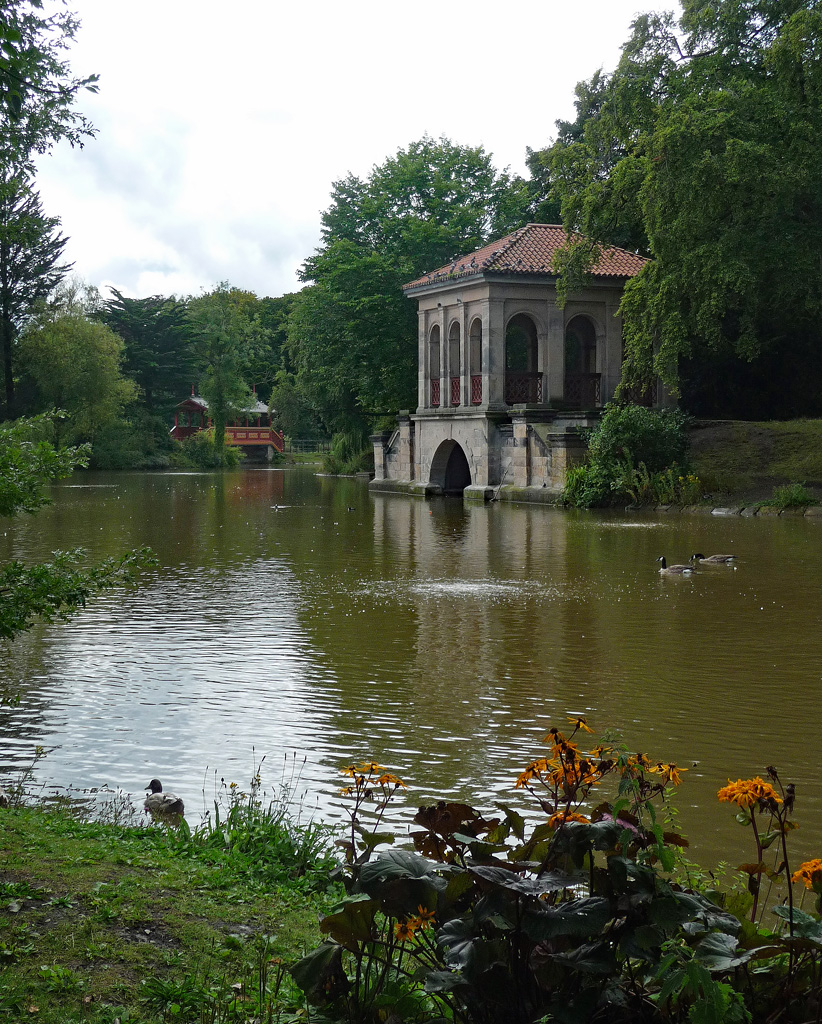
Roman Boathouse, Birkenhead Park

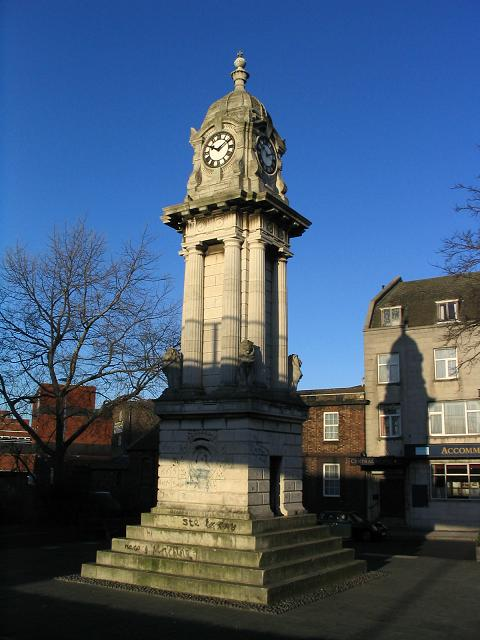
Edward VII Memorial Clock Tower, designed by Edmund Kirby

Birkenhead Park is the first publicly funded park in Britain. It was the forerunner of the Parks Movement, and its influence was far-reaching, in Britain and abroad – including on Frederick Law Olmsted's design for Central Park in New York City. Birkenhead Park was designed by Joseph Paxton in 1843 and officially opened in 1847, with great festivity. The park's Grand Entrance, modelled on the Temple of Illysus in Athens, and its 'Roman Boathouse' are notable features. There are sandstone lodges at the three entrances, each with a different style of architecture: Gothic, Norman and Italianate. The park has two lakes and an ornate 'Swiss Bridge'.

William Laird, a Scot, and his son John Laird, were influential in the design of the town. Parts were laid out in a grid-iron pattern like Edinburgh New Town with similar architecture. The chief architect was James Gillespie Graham from Edinburgh. This grid pattern was centred around Hamilton Square which was started in 1826 and, apart from Trafalgar Square in London, contains the most Grade I listed buildings in one place in England. including Birkenhead Town Hall. A short distance from Hamilton Square are two other landmarks: the Queensway Tunnel Main Entrance and the Woodside Ferry Terminal. The film Chariots of Fire had scenes shot at Woodside, representing Dover in the 1920s.

Other landmarks include Bidston Windmill and Bidston Observatory, both of which sit on Bidston Hill to the west of the town; Flaybrick Watertower; and Birkenhead Priory & St. Mary's Tower.

== Transport ==
=== Buses ===
Horse-drawn buses began operating in Birkenhead in 1848, to be replaced with motor vehicles after the First World War.

Present-day services are run by operators including Arriva and Stagecoach, which are coordinated by Merseytravel.

National Express provides long-distance coach services to other UK cities, with direct routes including London, Glasgow, Bangor and Newcastle.

==== Bus station ====
The bus station was opened in 1996. It is adjacent to The Grange shopping centre and Birkenhead Market.

It has a total of eleven stands and incorporates a travel centre. The main bus operators at the station include Arriva North West and Stagecoach Merseyside & South Lancashire.

Services using the bus station operate around the town of Birkenhead, throughout the Wirral and to the nearby city of Liverpool via the Queensway Tunnel. The station also has frequent services to as far away as Chester.

=== Railways ===
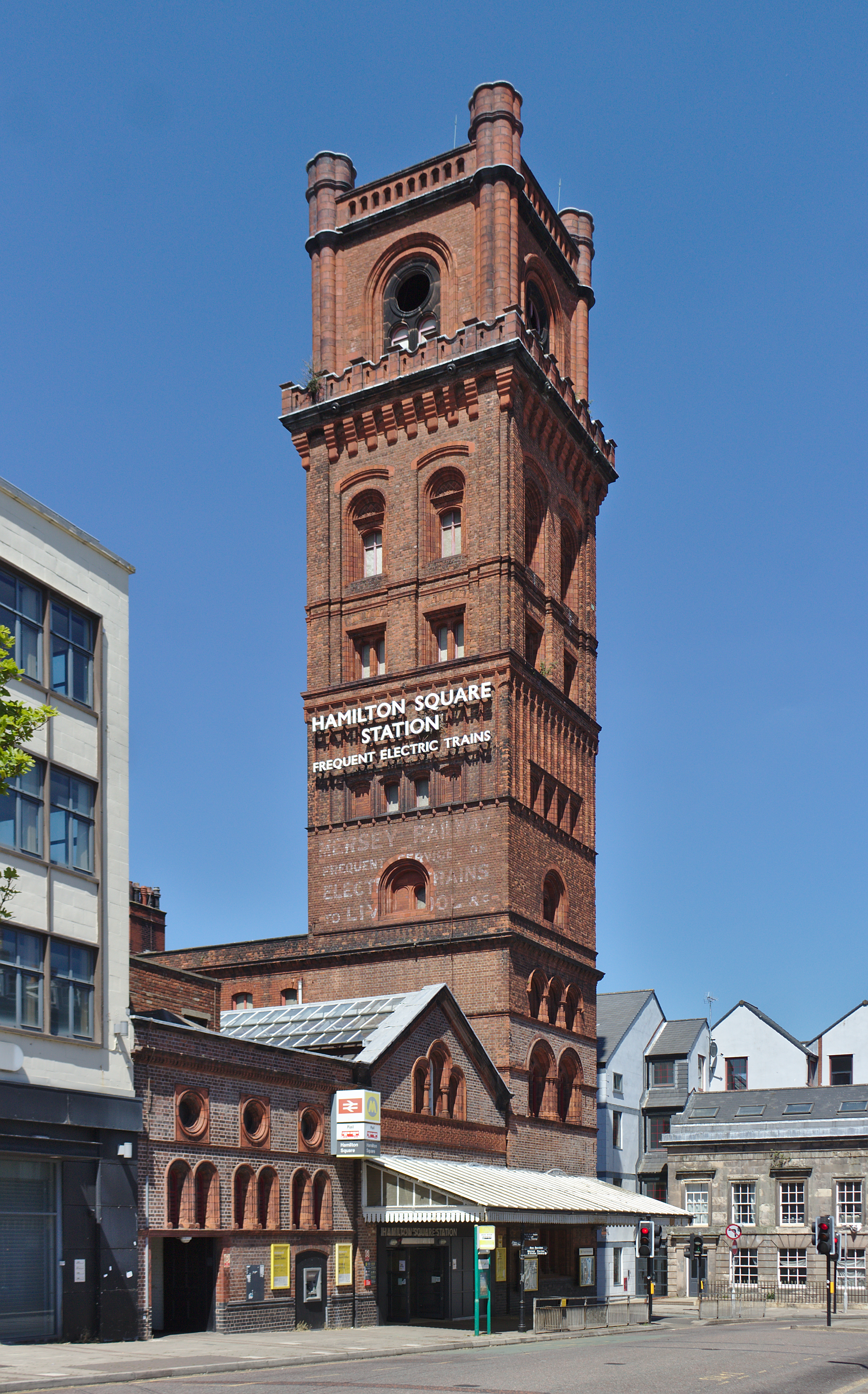
Hamilton Square station

The major underground station in Birkenhead is Birkenhead Hamilton Square, the nearest station to the ferry terminal. Hamilton Square station is linked to the Liverpool Loop of the Wirral Line, which includes Liverpool James Street, Moorfields, Liverpool Lime Street and Liverpool Central stations; all of these are underground. Other stations in the town include Birkenhead Central, which is open but below ground level; Green Lane, below ground level; Rock Ferry; Conway Park, below ground level; Birkenhead Park; Birkenhead North; and Bidston.

The Wirral Line from Birkenhead travels south to Chester and Ellesmere Port, north to New Brighton and westwards, across the Wirral Peninsula, to West Kirby. Bidston (in the north of Birkenhead) is at one end of the Borderlands Line, it serves the rural centre of Wirral, near Shotton it leaves England for Wales, serving Wrexham General and terminating at Wrexham Central.

Railways reached Birkenhead in 1840, when the Chester and Birkenhead Railway began services. Birkenhead Grange Lane station opened at the same time, becoming the town's first terminus. Birkenhead Dock station opened in 1866, as the eastern terminus of the Hoylake Railway. With the opening of the Woodside and Birkenhead Dock Street Tramway in 1873, this station probably became the world's first tram to train interchange. In 1886, Birkenhead and Liverpool were linked by an underground railway system, which today is part of the Merseyrail network.

From 1878 until its closure in 1967, Birkenhead Woodside station was the town's mainline railway terminus. Originally sited close to Woodside Ferry Terminal, the site had been redeveloped as part of Cammell Laird ship builders. Latterly, the adjacent dry dock at Cammell Laird was filled in and the area redeveloped to provide flats, a bus depot and offices for HM Land Registry and the Child Support Agency.

The town has one operational railway depot, Birkenhead North TMD; one disused, Birkenhead Central TMD; and two demolished, Birkenhead Mollington Street TMD and a further depot adjacent to Birkenhead Park station. The remains of the Birkenhead Dock Branch are still extant in a cutting through the centre of the town, which was used primarily for freight services. Much of the peripheral railway infrastructure, around the docks, has been removed since the 1980s.

=== Former tramways ===
Birkenhead had the first street tramway in Britain. Opened on 29 August 1860, the first line ran from Woodside (adjoining the terminal of the Mersey Ferry) to Birkenhead Park. This early system was horse-drawn and was the brainchild of flamboyant American, George Francis Train. A preserved tram was on display in the Woodside ferry terminal booking hall.

The system was later electrified and operated from 1901 as Birkenhead Corporation Tramways; it closed in 1937. Two replica trams, imported from Hong Kong, have been brought into service as part of a heritage tramway between Woodside and Wirral Transport Museum; Birkenhead Corporation Tramways car No.20 is preserved on this line.

As part of the Wirral Waters development, a street car service has been proposed, to be called Wirral Street Car.

=== Roads ===
Junctions 1 and 3 of the M53 motorway facilitate access to the national motorway network. The A41 trunk road connects Woodside with Marble Arch in London. Two road tunnels, the Queensway road tunnel from Birkenhead and the Kingsway road tunnel from Wallasey, run underneath the River Mersey and connect the town to Liverpool.

=== Maritime ===
Birkenhead's dock system is part of the Port of Liverpool, operated by the Mersey Docks and Harbour Company under the ownership of The Peel Group. The Twelve Quays ferry terminal allows a direct freight and passenger vehicle service to Dublin and Belfast. Daily Belfast services are run by Stena Line, using their RoPax ferries MS Stena Edda and MS Stena Embla from 2020 to 2021, which replaced MS Stena Lagan and MS Stena Mersey. In 2024, a freight only service to Dublin commenced. The Mersey Ferry at Woodside operates a passenger service to Liverpool and chartered cruising.

=== Aviation ===
The nearest airport is Liverpool John Lennon Airport (formerly known as Speke Airport), about 8 miles (13 km) from Birkenhead. Manchester Airport is approximately 40 mi (64 km) away. Other nearby aviation facilities include Hawarden Airport and RAF Woodvale. Former airfields in the area include RAF Hooton Park and Bidston Aerodrome.

== Education ==
=== Schools ===
Birkenhead has a number of maintained schools, including Birkenhead Park School (formed after the merger of Rock Ferry High School and Park High School) and the only all-boys Catholic grammar school in the area St. Anselm's College.

Birkenhead also has two independently run schools. The oldest is Birkenhead School. It was exclusively a boys' school from its founding in 1860 until 2000, when its sixth form became co-educational. It became fully co-educational for pupils aged 3–18 in 2008. "Old Birkonians" (as former pupils are known) include the lawyer F.E. Smith (Lord Birkenhead); Andreas Whittam Smith (chairman of the British Board of Film Classification (BBFC) and founder of The Independent newspaper); mountaineer Andrew Irvine; Philip Toosey (hero at the Bridge on the River Kwai); and Tony Hall (former Director-General of the BBC).

Birkenhead High School Academy, formerly Birkenhead Girls High School, is an all-ability state funded girls' Academy. It was founded in 1885 and caters for girls aged 3–19. Its sponsor was the Girls' Day School Trust, but is now publicly funded. Its alumnae include the actress Patricia Routledge. Birkenhead Girls High School decided to become a state-funded Academy school in 2009, increasing the availability of its education. Like the change to co-education at Birkenhead School, this decision was largely driven by falling pupil numbers; however to this date, it remains a single-sex school.

Birkenhead Institute Grammar School existed from 1889 in Whetstone Lane, before being moved to Claughton in the 1970s. The school closed in 1994. The school's alumni include Wilfred Owen.

=== Colleges ===
Previously situated at Borough Road, Birkenhead's college has campuses at Europa Boulevard and Twelve Quays. The college was originally Birkenhead Technical College, and has been known as Wirral Metropolitan College since the 1980s. The college had a theatre on Borough Road named after one of its most famous former students, Glenda Jackson, the Oscar-winning actress and Member of Parliament, herself a Birkonian, born in 1936. The Borough Road campus and the Glenda Jackson Theatre were demolished in late 2005, to make way for flats, although Wirral Metropolitan College flourishes on other sites across Wirral. The theatre secretly housed an emergency command centre for the region in its basement, accessible via the college. Politicians and officials would have retreated to this secure bunker in the event of nuclear war to co-ordinate the recovery effort. By the 1990s, after the end of the Cold War, the bunker had been decommissioned and the surrounding complex of rooms was used by the college as a rehearsal space and recording studio.

Other colleges include the Birkenhead Sixth Form College, in the Claughton area of the town, formerly the site of Corpus Christi Catholic High School.

== Religion ==
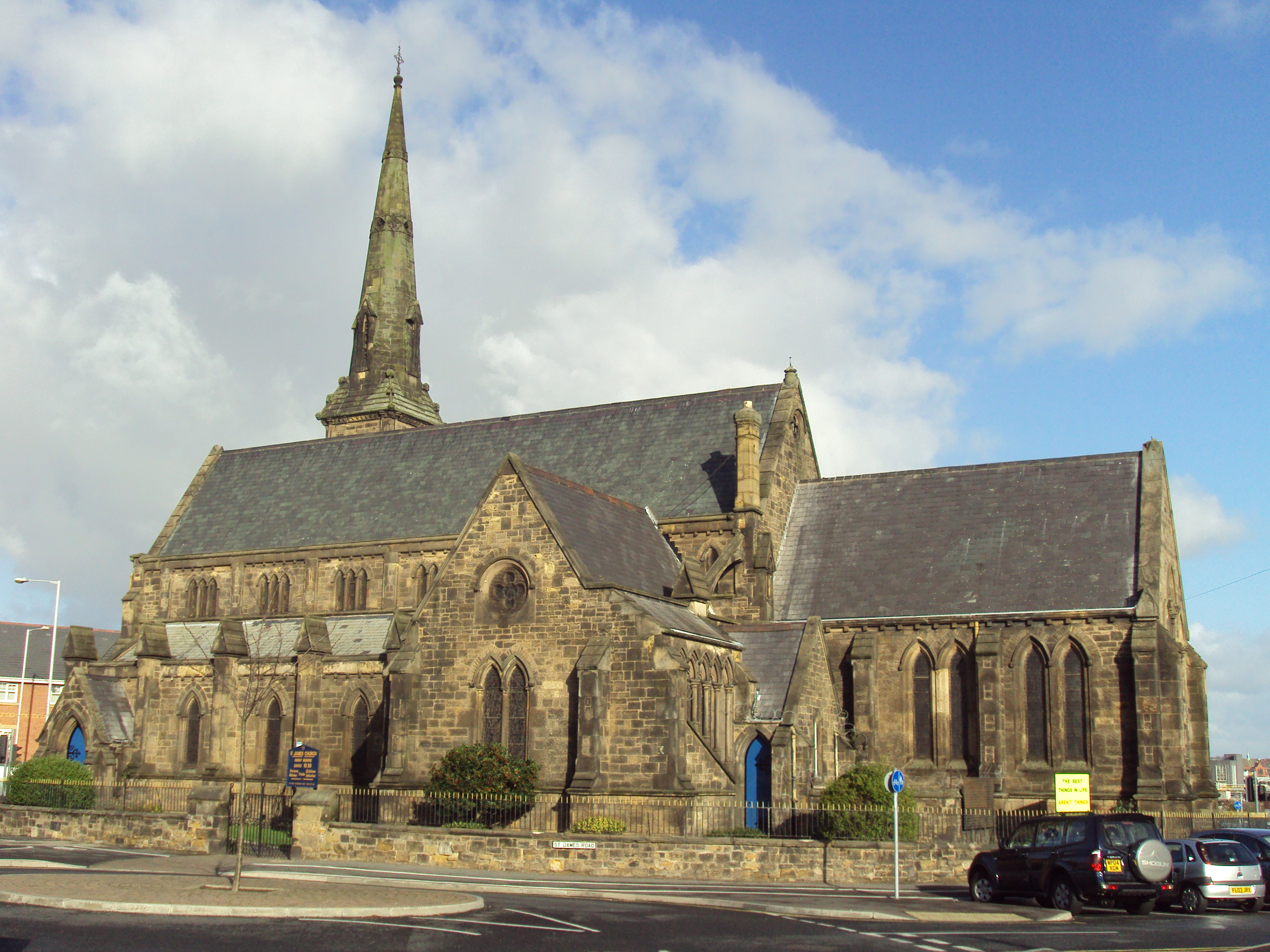
St James' Church

Religion in Birkenhead dates back to 1150 when Hamon de Masci founded Birkenhead Priory for the Benedictine order.

The current Anglican churches are St. James' Church, Christ Church and the Church of Christ the King which are all within the Diocese of Chester. Julie Conalty is the current suffragan Bishop of Birkenhead.

Roman Catholic churches include the Church of Our Lady of the Immaculate Conception and St. Werburgh's Church which are within the Diocese of Shrewsbury.

The other religious buildings include the Wirral Christian Centre of the Elim Pentecostal Church and the Islamic Shah Jalal Mosque. The Jewish Birkenhead Synagogue existed from 1890 and closed prior to 2006.

Flaybrick Memorial Gardens contains the town's former main cemetery, which is situated near to St. James' Church. Flaybrick Hill Cemetery has been superseded by Landican Cemetery, opened in 1934.

== Healthcare ==
Birkenhead is served by Wirral University Teaching Hospital NHS Foundation Trust (through its Arrowe Park Hospital, St Catherine's Health Centre and Clatterbridge Hospital sites) and Wirral Primary Care Trust. Formerly, Birkenhead was also served by Birkenhead General Hospital on Park Road North and St. James' Hospital in Claughton, now demolished and redeveloped for housing.

== Arts, sports and leisure ==
=== Arts ===
The Laird School of Art was the first public school of art outside London and was given to the town by John Laird. It opened on 27 September 1871. The Williamson Art Gallery was opened in 1928 and houses a fine collection of paintings, porcelain and pottery.

In 1856, Birkenhead Library was opened as the country's first public library in an unincorporated borough. The library was situated in Hamilton Street until 1909, when it moved to a new building in Market Street South, near Birkenhead Market. In the 1930s, this building (along with much of the surrounding area) was demolished to make way for the entrance to the Queensway Tunnel. The present library, Birkenhead Central Library, is situated on Borough Road and was opened by King George V in 1934.

Despite being in England, Birkenhead (known as Penbedw, in Welsh) hosted Wales' National Eisteddfod in 1917 as well as an unofficial National Eisteddfod event in 1879. As in Liverpool, migrants from Wales, especially North Wales, contributed greatly to the growth of the town and its cultural development in the 19th century. The first local Birkenhead Eisteddfod, a precursor of the national events, took place in 1864. The 1917 National Eisteddfod was notable for the award of the chair to the poet Ellis Humphrey Evans, known as Hedd Wyn. The winner was announced, and the crowd waited for the winner to accept congratulations before the chairing ceremony, but no winner appeared. It was then announced that Hedd Wyn had been killed the previous month on the battlefield in Belgium, and the bardic chair was draped in black. These events were portrayed in the Academy Award nominated film Hedd Wyn, and were apparently intended as a protest against the war policies of Prime Minister David Lloyd George, who was present. There is a commemorative stone for the event in Birkenhead Park. The first meeting of the international Celtic Congress also took place at the Birkenhead Eisteddfod.

The Argyle Theatre was a major theatre and music hall which opened on 28 December 1868 and became notable for the calibre of artistes who appeared there. Later in its life, it was also used as a cinema. The theatre was destroyed by bombing in 1940.

The Theatre Royal, opened on 31 October 1864, was in Argyle Street and had a capacity of 1,850. This theatre was closed in 1919 and demolished in the 1930s. Another theatre, the Hippodrome, which was converted into a cinema in the 1930s, stood on the site of what became the Co-operative department store in Grange Road.

The Little Theatre was established in 1958 from a converted former Presbyterian church. The Pacific Road Arts Centre in Woodside opened in 1999, but in 2015 was converted to a "Business Hub".

=== Media ===
Birkenhead is served by the Liverpool Echo local daily newspaper. The local weekly newspaper is the Wirral Globe and the online-only news website is Birkenhead News.

There are four local radio stations that transmit to Birkenhead: BBC Radio Merseyside, Hits Radio Liverpool, Greatest Hits Liverpool and Capital Liverpool.

Birkenhead is within the television regions of BBC North West and ITV's Granada Television, although Welsh regional TV transmitted from the Moel y Parc transmitter in Flintshire can also be received. The local television station Liverpool TV also broadcasts to the area.

=== Leisure ===
As well as Birkenhead Park, other recreational open spaces in Birkenhead include Mersey Park and Victoria Park. Arrowe Park is a large area of parkland at the western edge of the town. In 1929, the 3rd World Scout Jamboree was held there.

The first two Boy Scout groups in the world are thought to have been founded as the 1st and 2nd Birkenhead groups at YMCA on the same night in 1908.

=== Sport ===
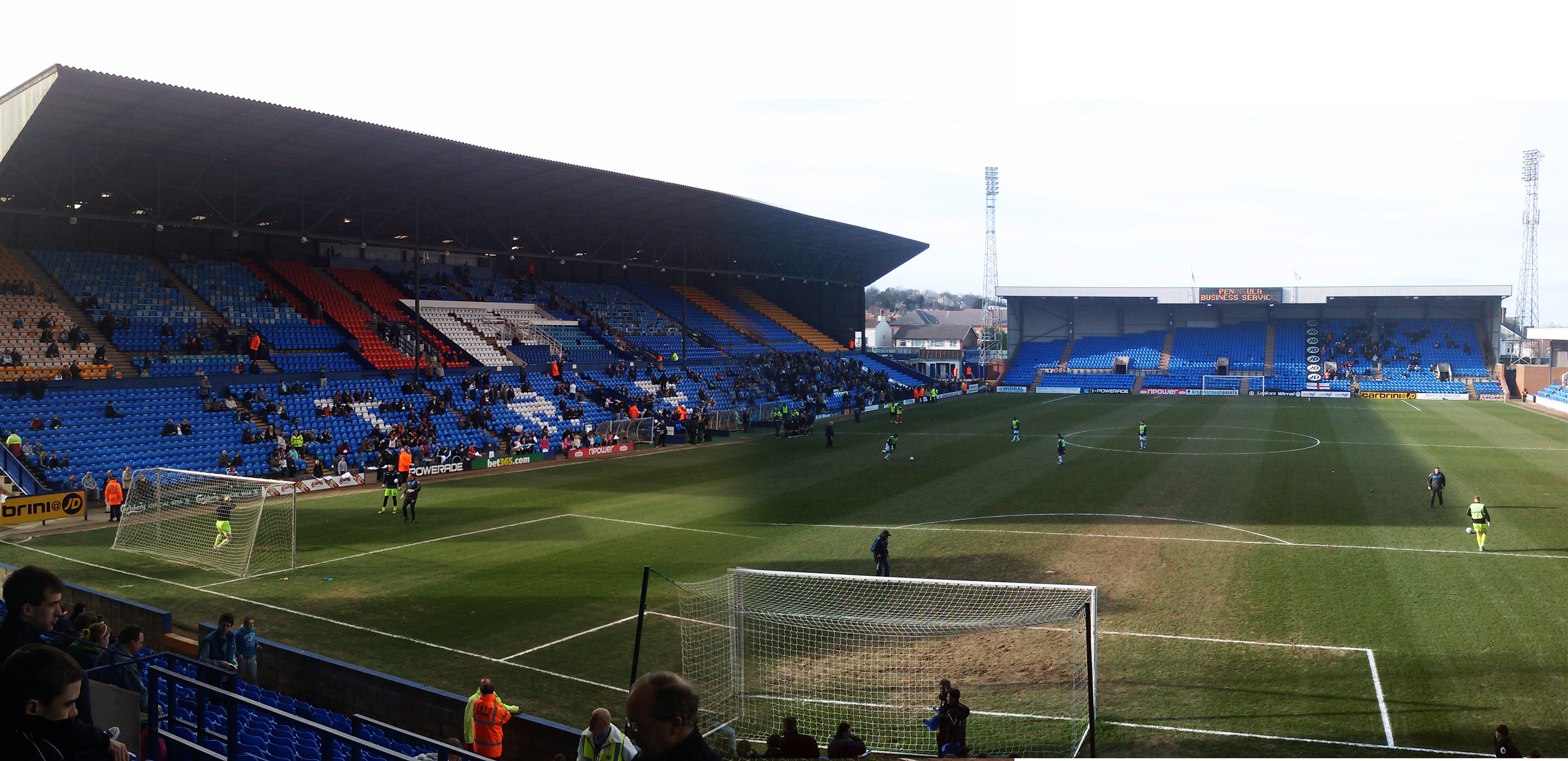
Prenton Park

The first known football club on the Wirral was Birkenhead F.C. which was founded in 1879 by Robert E. Lythgoe, a former Druids F.C. player. An unrelated, disbanded side had played under the name Tranmere Rovers Cricket Club in 1881–82. Other clubs included Belmont Football Club, founded in 1884. They adopted the name Tranmere Rovers F.C. the following year, and are a professional team who play at Prenton Park near the Tranmere area of the town. They were a founder member of Division Three North in 1921, and were a member of The Football League until 2015, when they were relegated to the Conference, the fifth tier of English football. They returned to the Football League three seasons later, after a 2–1 play-off final win against Boreham Wood F.C. Cammell Laird 1907 F.C. is the town's semi-professional football club who play at Kirklands in Rock Ferry. They play in the North West Counties League Division One.

The Birkenhead Park Football Club was founded in 1871, the same year as the Rugby Football Union. The club originally played in the Lower Park but moved to their current home in the Upper Park in 1885. Birkenhead Park also has its own cricket club.

Also in the town are the Birkenhead North End and Victoria Cycling Clubs. Olympic riders from the clubs include Chris Boardman, Mark Bell, Steve Cummings and Rachel Heal.

Birkenhead has been host to various rowing clubs since 1840. At present, Liverpool Victoria Rowing Club operates from a facility at the western end of West Float.

== Cultural references ==
Birkenhead is indirectly referenced by "the Birken'ead drill" in Rudyard Kipling's poem "Soldier an' Sailor Too": To take your chance in the thick of a rush, with firing all about, / Is nothing so bad when you've cover to 'and, an' leave an' likin' to shout; / But to stand an' be still to the Birken'ead drill is a damn tough bullet to chew, / An' they done it, the Jollies – 'Er Majesty's Jollies – soldier an' sailor too!, as it refers to heroism by Royal Marines during the sinking of HMS Birkenhead, herself named after the town in which it was built. Other authors have done this as well.

Birkenhead is mentioned in the song "What She Said" on the album Meat Is Murder by the Smiths: "What she read/All heady books/She'd sit and prophesise/(It took a tattooed boy from Birkenhead/To really really open her eyes)." The town is also referred to in the song "Everything Is Sorrow" on the Boo Radleys' C'mon Kids album: I worked in Birkenhead for you/It brings me tears even now.

A fairly detailed description of the town is given in Paul O'Grady's memoirs, At My Mother's Knee... and Other Low Joints: The Autobiography.

The 1998 book, Awaydays, and the 2009 film of the same name are set in Birkenhead.

It has been suggested that Robert Louis Stevenson set his 1881 classic novel Treasure Island in the towns of Birkenhead and Wallasey and that the French science fiction writer Jules Verne set his 1874 novel The Mysterious Island in Birkenhead.

== Notable people ==
See Category:People from Merseyside

=== Actors and performers ===
In the arts, Birkenhead has produced several actors and performers including Lionel Gamlin, Roger Abbott, Glenda Jackson, Anew McMaster, Lewis Collins, Megs Jenkins, Taron Egerton, Dominic Purcell, Patricia Routledge, Paul O'Grady (also known as Lily Savage), soprano Valerie Masterson and baritone George Baker. The dancer and actor Lindsay Kemp was born in the town but as a child moved to South Shields. Opera director Graham Vick was born in Birkenhead.

=== Artists ===
Some notable artists were born in the town, such as Philip Wilson Steer, Robert Talbot Kelly, Tom Palin, Bessie Bamber, Annie R. Merrylees Arnold, Percy Bigland, the workers at the Della Robbia Pottery and two cartoonists: Norman Thelwell and Bill Tidy.

=== Authors and journalists ===
Birkenhead has produced poets and authors such as A.S.J. Tessimond, Adrian Henri and Michael Z. Williamson. The World War I poet Wilfred Owen, though born in Oswestry, lived in Birkenhead from the age of four and was educated at the Birkenhead Institute High School (now demolished) before moving with his family to Shrewsbury in 1907. Andreas Whittam Smith, founder editor of The Independent, grew up in Birkenhead, where his father was an Anglican clergyman.

=== Musicians ===
There are several musicians linked to the area. Freddie Marks from Rod, Jane and Freddy grew up in Birkenhead, and John Gorman of The Scaffold was born there. Indie band Half Man Half Biscuit hail from Birkenhead, as did boogie-rock band Engine, Paul Heaton, lead singer of the Housemartins and the Beautiful South, singer/songwriter Charlie Landsborough, and Desmond Briscoe, the co-founder and original manager of the pioneering BBC Radiophonic Workshop. Elvis Costello moved to Birkenhead in 1971 with his mother, who was from Liverpool, although Costello's father was himself from Birkenhead.

Tony Friel (bassist from the Fall and the Passage), synthpop musician David Hughes (of Dalek I Love You, Orchestral Manoeuvres in the Dark and Godot) and Malcolm Holmes (drummer with pop group Orchestral Manoeuvres in the Dark) were born in Birkenhead. David Balfe (music manager, and member of Big in Japan, the Teardrop Explodes) attended primary and secondary school there. Miles Kane, musician, singer and songwriter and member of The Last Shadow Puppets and The Rascals, was born in the town as well as the opera singer Hugh Beresford. Classical composer William Lewarne Harris (1919–2013) was born in Birkenhead.

=== Politicians and public figures ===
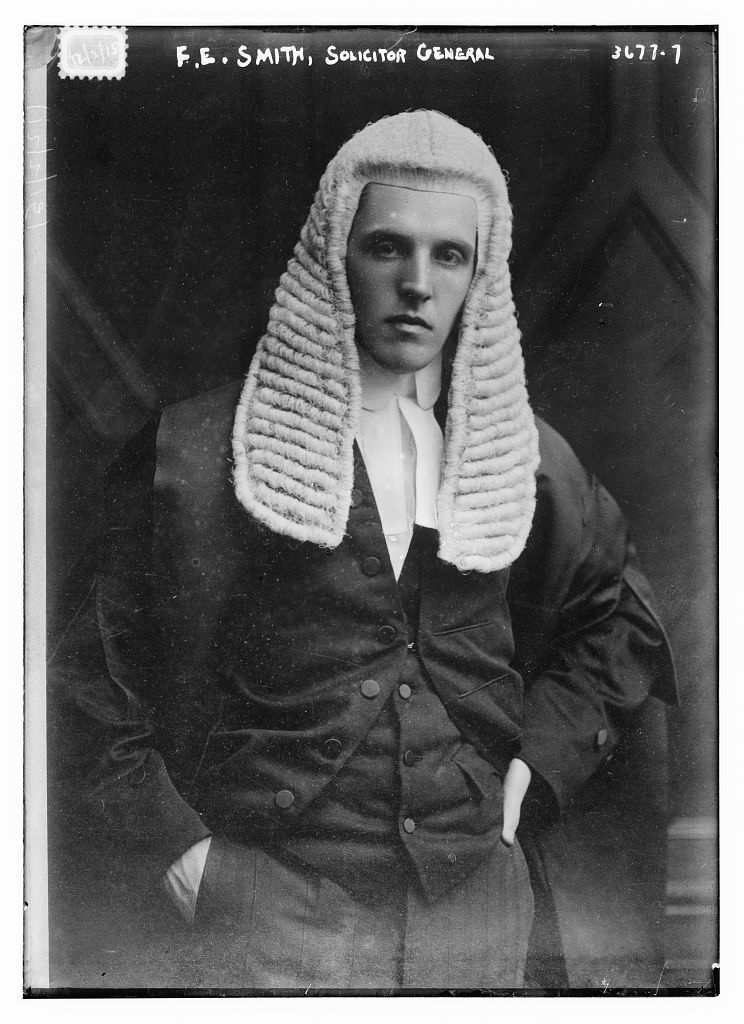
F. E. Smith, 1st Earl of Birkenhead

F. E. Smith, 1st Earl of Birkenhead, a leading Conservative politician of the early 20th century, was born in the town, as were Liberal Democrat politician Malcolm Bruce, and Tony Hall, Baron Hall of Birkenhead, the Director-General of the BBC. Also born in the town was Theodora Llewelyn Davies, a barrister and penal reform campaigner, who in 1920 was the first woman admitted to the Inner Temple and Florence Barry, suffragist, member of the Women's Social and Political Union (WSPU) and leader of the Roman Catholic feminist organisation St. Joan’s International Alliance.

=== Scientists and technologists ===
Aerodynamicists Gwen Alston and Melvill Jones were born in Birkenhead. Physiologist Hugh Huxley was born in Birkenhead

=== Explorers and soldiers ===
Sandy Irvine, a participant of the 1924 British Mount Everest expedition, was born in Birkenhead. There has been speculation that George Mallory and he reached the summit. Alan Rouse, a mountaineer who died in the 1986 K2 disaster, was educated in Birkenhead. Daniel Poole, a recipient of the Distinguished Conduct Medal during World War I was born in the town. Brigadier Sir Philip Toosey, known for his time commanding British prisoners of the Japanese during World War II, was born at Oxton.

=== Sportspeople ===
Birkenhead has also produced notable sportsmen such as Matt Dawson, the rugby union player, golfer Paul Waring; 'Dixie' Dean (Everton F.C.), record-breaking footballer, who was born at 313 Laird Street; and several other footballers including Peter Davenport, Jason McAteer, David Thompson, Max Power, and Jodie Taylor (England international "Lioness"). The football manager Nigel Adkins also hails from the town.

=== Others ===
Gary Finlay, the murderer of Graham McKenna, was born in Birkenhead, as was the prominent occultist Alex Sanders.

== Twin towns ==
Birkenhead is twinned, as a part of Wirral, with:

- Gennevilliers, France
- Latina, Lazio, Italy
- Lorient, France
- Reno, Nevada, United States,

=== Twin towns – Sister cities ===
Birkenhead also has a Sister City Agreement with:

- Midland, Texas, United States

== Future ==
The major redevelopment project under consideration is Peel Holdings' "Wirral Waters". This would allow for £4.5 billion of investment in the regeneration of the dockland area. This equates with an investment of over £14,000 for each of the 320,000 residents of the Wirral. At the East Float and Vittoria Dock, the development would include 5,000,000 square feet (465,000 m^{2}) of new office space and 11,000,000 square feet (1,000,000 m^{2}) for new residential flats. A retail and leisure quarter at the former Bidston Dock site would encompass another 571,000 square feet (53,000 m^{2}) of space. The whole project would create more than 27,000 permanent new jobs, aside from the employment required for construction and other peripheral employment. The development would be expected to take up to thirty years.

Redevelopment work is also planned in the town centre, in particular the areas surrounding Birkenhead market and Princess Pavement.

== See also ==
- Listed buildings in Birkenhead
