= Clatterbridge Health Park =

Health care campus in Merseyside, England

Coordinates: 53.3351°N 3.0226°W

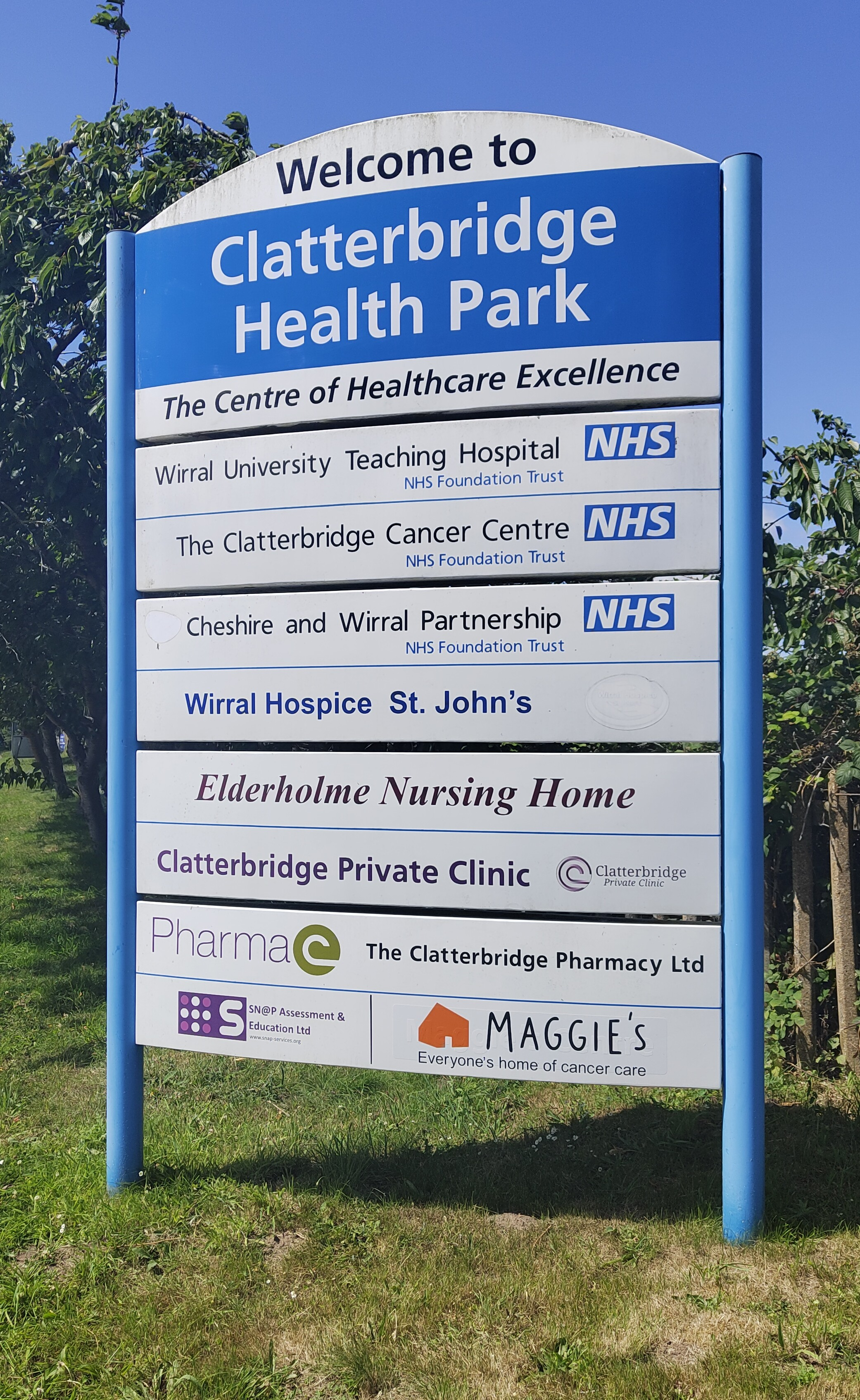
Welcome sign at the entrance to the Clatterbridge Health Park site indicating the organisations within

Clatterbridge Health Park is a campus of otherwise independent, health care-related organisations, including three separate NHS trusts.

Located in Bebington, Wirral, close to Junction 4 of the M53 motorway, the health park was the former site of the defunct Wirral Union Workhouse. As such, it shares much of its history with that of Clatterbridge Hospital.

== NHS organisations ==
=== Clatterbridge Cancer Centre – Wirral ===
Clatterbridge Cancer Centre – Wirral provides chemotherapy and radiotherapy on an outpatient basis, diagnostic services, and cancer support for patients and relatives. There is a private radiotherapy clinic on site, which is a joint venture with Ireland's Mater Private Hospital. The hospital hosts the UK’s only proton therapy centre for eye cancers.

=== Clatterbridge Hospital ===
Clatterbridge Hospital is managed by Wirral University Teaching Hospital NHS Foundation Trust. It was a general hospital until the opening of Arrowe Park Hospital. These days it is mainly used for planned surgery and rehabilitation care, and hosts many of the trusts ancillary services, for example the finance department. During the COVID-19 pandemic the hospital was one of the first vaccination centres to open in England.

=== Clatterbridge Diagnostics ===
Clatterbridge Diagnostics is a community diagnostic centre that is run in partnership by Clatterbridge Cancer Centre and Wirral University Teaching Hospital. The centre opened 2021.

=== Springview ===
Springview is a mental health hospital operated by Cheshire and Wirral Partnership NHS Foundation Trust. It offers inpatient care for mental health conditions, such as eating disorders.

== Non-NHS organisations ==
=== Claire House Children's Hospice ===
Claire House Children's Hospice is also located within the grounds of the former workhouse, but has a separate entrance and is not accessible from the main site.

=== Elderholme Nursing Home ===
Elderholme Nursing Home is operated by the registered charity, Wirrelderly. The home opened in 1990, and provides residential care for people over the age of 65 with personal care needs, such as those with dementia or learning disabilities.

=== Wirral Hospice St John's ===
Wirral Hospice St John's opened in 1983, and provides hospice care to people with life-limiting conditions. Wirral Hospice has 16 inpatient beds, an outpatient service, and can provide "hospice at home" care. The hospice is a registered charity.

== See also ==
- Radio Clatterbridge
