= Murder of Graham McKenna =

Murder perpetrated by Gary Carl Finlay

The murder of Graham McKenna was perpetrated by Gary Carl Finlay (born 1962, in Birkenhead) that occurred in The Wirral on 10 January 2009. The victim, Graham McKenna (1963 - 2009), was a former soldier, having served 22 years with the 22nd (Cheshire) Regiment. He was still involved with the military, holding the rank of corporal. He had taught Territorial Army recruits at 42 Brigade's Regional Training Centre at Altcar, Formby, on the morning of his death.

== The murder ==
McKenna and his son Michael were walking towards a bus stop on Upton Road, Claughton, when Finlay ambushed them. They were repeatedly shanked in the abdomen but managed to stagger to nearby Speedwell Road. Both were taken to Arrowe Park hospital where Graham McKenna died. Despite multiple stab wounds, Michael survived. Although the police had not yet released details of the conversation which took place during the incident, there seemed to be little doubt as to the identity of the attacker.

== Motive and aftermath ==
Finlay's connection to McKenna was that his ex-wife is a sister of McKenna's widow. His motive was that McKenna had offered to give evidence in Finlay's acrimonious divorce proceedings. Finlay also stabbed Graham's son, Michael McKenna, age 14, a pupil at Ridgeway school in Prenton. Both victims were attacked shortly after leaving their home to go to watch an Everton game. Father and son were season ticket holders.

Following the murder, Finlay went on the run. The hunt for him received massive publicity on Thursday 12 February 2009, after an emotional and moving appeal for information made by McKenna's widow was repeatedly broadcast on BBC Radio 5. His older brother, Paul appealed for him to give himself up to police. Members of the public were advised not to approach him, as he was considered to be dangerous, and that if anyone saw him they should report the sighting to their nearest police station.

Gary Finlay appeared on UK's "most wanted list" and on UK TV news. The story was featured in the UK National newspapers and was also carried by international news agencies.

Finlay was arrested on 25 February 2009 by British police, and sentenced to a minimum of 25 years after admitting to the murder of Graham McKenna and attempted murder of his son Michael McKenna.
