= Radio Clatterbridge =

England
- Broadcast area: Clatterbridge Health Park
- Frequency: 1386 kHz

Links
- Website: www.radioclatterbridge.co.uk www.radioclatterbridge.co.uk/player.htm

Radio Clatterbridge is a community hospital radio station based at Clatterbridge Health Park, Wirral, UK. It is also a registered UK charity.

The station notably carried the earliest surviving recorded broadcast interview with the Beatles. It is one of the oldest radio stations in the UK.

== History ==
Radio Clatterbridge began life as a group of boys from a local youth group. As an aid to providing some vital rest and recuperation, the boys decided to visit sick patients at Clatterbridge General Hospital. Their idea was to play them songs at their bedsides using a portable record player. The idea was so popular that it soon became possible to buy permanent gramophones and "broadcast" the songs back to the patients, via a simple land-line system.

Soon the new radio station was broadcasting a number of programmes every week. One of those, Sunday Spin, created musical history. Presenter Monty Lister recorded the first broadcast interview with a new up-and-coming band, called The Beatles in 1962. This was marked with a special anniversary reunion in 2002.

As the Swinging Sixties moved into the Seventies, so the Radio Clatterbridge premises moved into Larch House. The station remained in these studios for nearly two decades.

Digital technology was first introduced during the late 1980s, as the station (now equipped with two studios) began playing its first CDs.

Before long Radio Clatterbridge was on the move again. This time it was only temporary. In 1993 the charity made its home near to St John's Hospice. The temporary move lasted for nearly a decade.

Radio Clatterbridge finally made its permanent move into the old boiler house in 2001. The charity's new home had to be developed from scratch. A series of successful community grant applications enabled Radio Clatterbridge to fit a new studio for the new millennium.

New computer equipment in 2003 enabled the station to do something it had never been able to do before. Radio Clatterbridge now provides a round-the-clock service to the health park.

== Today ==
Staffed by about 30 volunteers, Radio Clatterbridge provides an important and unique service to patients and staff at Clatterbridge Health Park. It is heard via a landline service wards throughout Clatterbridge Hospital, Clatterbridge Centre for Oncology.

In November 2011, the station began broadcasting to the remainder of the site on 1386 AM (Medium Wave). It means that for the first time, patients at St John's Hospice in the Wirral, Claire House Children's Hospice and Elderholme are able to hear the service along with their visitors and staff.

Ward visitors regularly collect requests which are played on air. These are supplemented by requests received from patients' relatives around the world via the charity's website. Radio Clatterbridge also receives requests for patients via both Facebook and Twitter.
