= Grange Road West drill hall =

Sports centre and former military drill hall in Birkenhead, Wirral, England

Grange Road West drill hall, Birkenhead
- Birkenhead, Merseyside
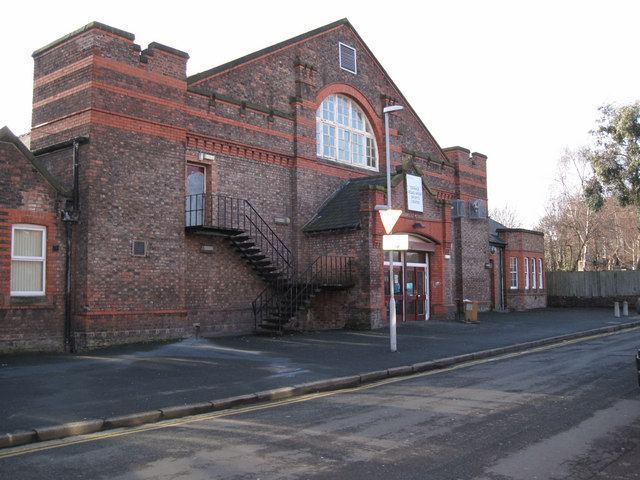
- Grange Road West drill hall, Birkenhead

Site information
- Type: Drill hall

Location
- Location in Merseyside
- Coordinates: 53.38924°N 3.04122°W

Site history
- Built: c.1900
- Built for: War Office
- In use: c.1900 – 1967

The Grange Road West drill hall is a former military installation, and now a sports centre, in Birkenhead, Merseyside.

== History ==
The building was designed as the headquarters of the 1st Volunteer Battalion, the Cheshire Regiment who relocated from the Park Road South drill hall in around 1900. This unit evolved to become the 4th Battalion, The Cheshire Regiment in 1908. The battalion was mobilised at the drill hall in August 1914 before being deployed to Gallipoli and ultimately the Western Front. The battalion amalgamated with the 5th Battalion to form the 4th/5th (Earl of Chester's) Battalion in 1921. The 4th/5th (Earl of Chester's) Battalion evolved to become the 4th Battalion in 1939, just before the Second World War, and, although it continued to be based at Grange Road West, it was disbanded in 1967. The drill hall, being surplus to requirements, was sold, in 1969, to Birkenhead County Borough Council who converted it into a sports centre. It is now the home of Birkenhead Trampoline Club and Wirral Gymnastics Club.
