= Wirral Women and Children's Hospital =

Hospital in Merseyside, England

- Wirral University Teaching Hospital NHS Foundation Trust
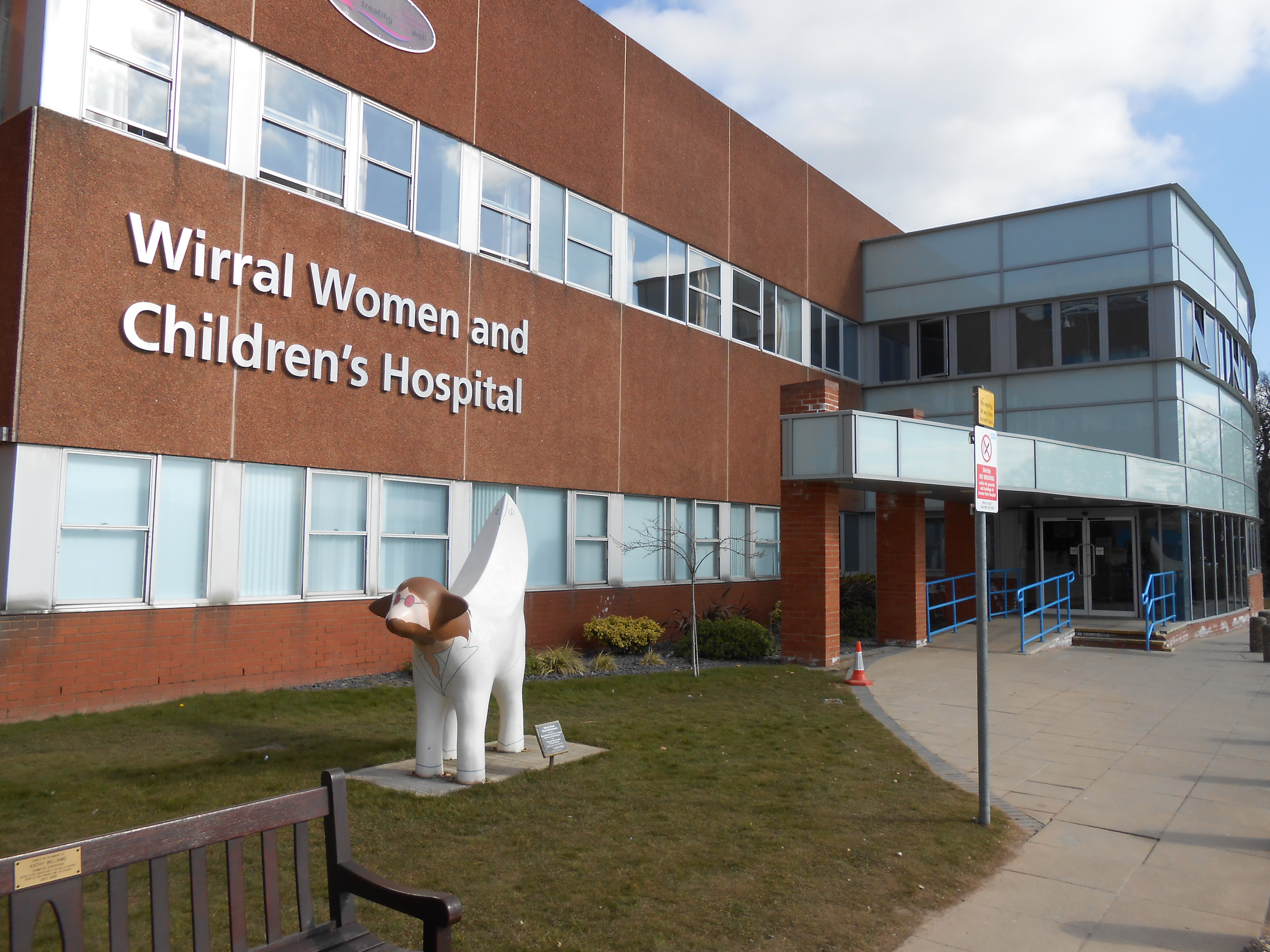
- Main entrance to Wirral Women and Children's Hospital with the Superabbeyroad mini-Superlambanana in the foreground.

- Shown in Merseyside

Geography
- Location: Arrowe Park Road, Upton, Wirral. Merseyside CH49 5PE, United Kingdom
- Coordinates: 53.370126°N 3.095653°W

Organisation
- Care system: Public NHS
- Type: Specialist/Teaching
- Affiliated university: University of Liverpool School of Medical Education

History
- Founded: 2011

Links
- Website: www.wuth.nhs.uk
- Lists: Hospitals in the United Kingdom

Wirral Women and Children's Hospital is located on the Arrowe Park Hospital campus, in Upton, Wirral, Merseyside and was founded following a redevelopment of the maternity and gynaecology wing of Arrowe Park Hospital. Although now considered a separate hospital, it remains managed by Wirral University Teaching Hospital NHS Foundation Trust.

== History ==
The original maternity and gynaecology unit was opened by, and dedicated to, the Duchess of Westminster. Phased redevelopment work that would see the children's wards and outpatient department move from the main hospital building over to the maternity and gynaecology annexe began in 2009. In March 2011, the remodelled Wirral Women and Children's Hospital was officially reopened by the Countess of Wessex.

In 2012, the Wirral Women and Children's Hospital featured in the BBC Two documentary series The Midwives.
