= Birkenhead General Hospital =

Former hospital in Birkenhead, Wirral, England

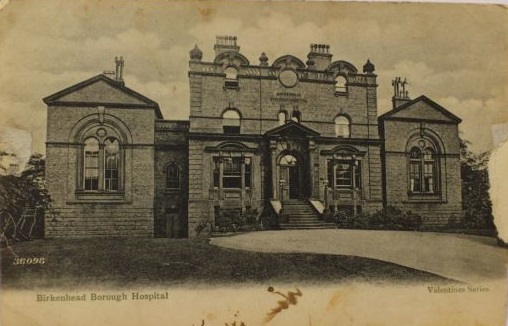
- Birkenhead Borough Hospital

- Shown in Merseyside

Geography
- Location: Park Road North, Birkenhead, England, United Kingdom
- Coordinates: 53.395817°N 3.034507°W

Organisation
- Care system: National Health Service
- Type: General

History
- Founded: 1863
- Closed: 1982

Birkenhead General Hospital (known as Birkenhead Borough Hospital until 1926) was a hospital situated on Park Road North, between Prince Edward Street and Livingstone Street, in Birkenhead, England.

== History ==
The hospital was built in 1862 and opened the following year as Borough Hospital. The name was changed to Birkenhead General Hospital in 1926. From 1948 it was run by the Birkenhead Hospital Management Committee, and after 1974 by the Wirral Area Health Authority. After services were transferred to the newly opened Arrowe Park Hospital, the building ceased to be used in 1982.
