= Church of Our Lady of the Immaculate Conception, Birkenhead =

Coordinates: 53.3999°N 3.0416°W

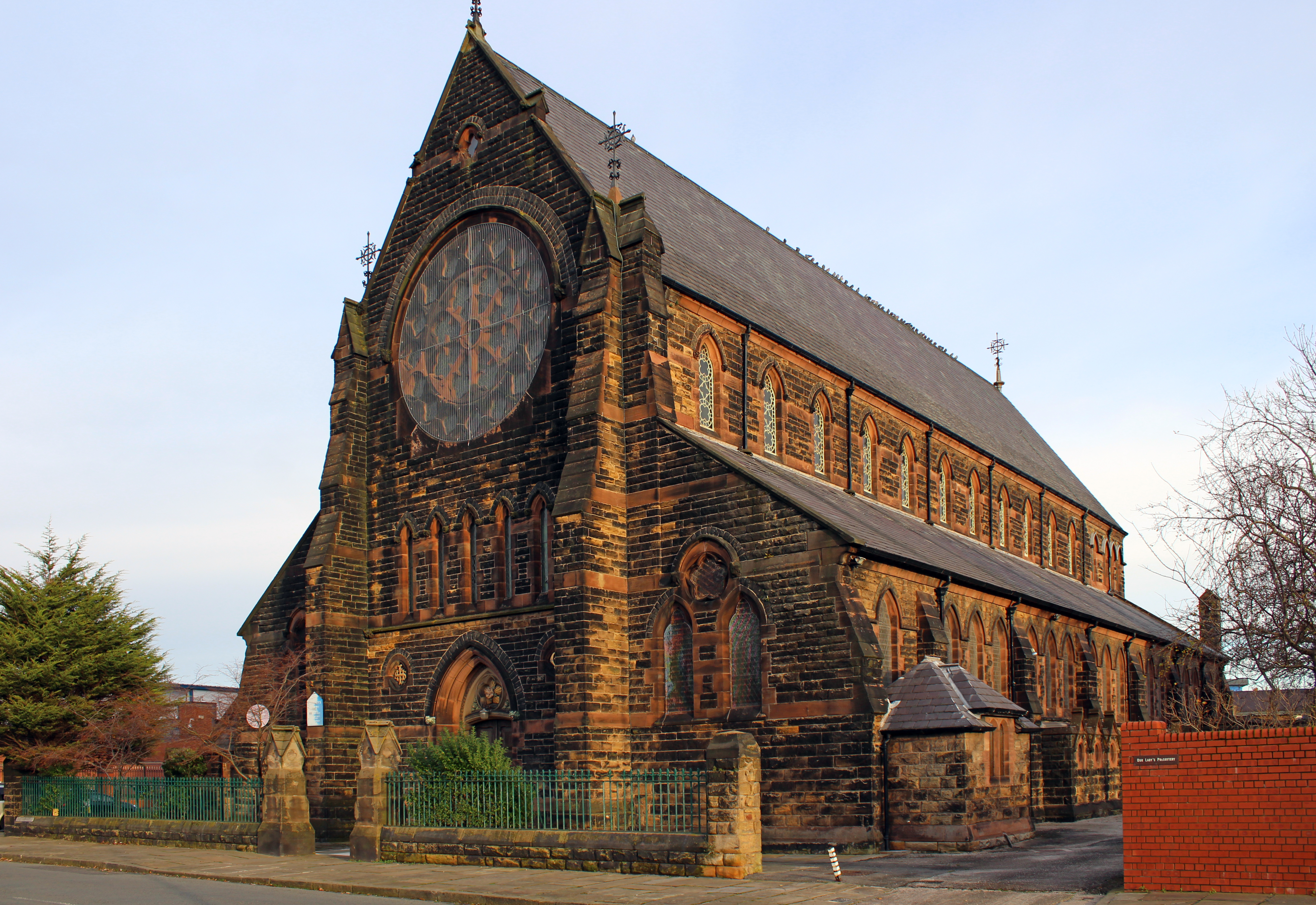

- Location in Merseyside
- OS grid reference: SJ 308 897
- Location: Cavendish Street, Birkenhead, Wirral, Merseyside
- Country: England
- Denomination: Roman Catholic
- Website: Church of Our Lady of the Immaculate Conception, Birkenhead

Architecture
- Functional status: Active
- Heritage designation: Grade II
- Designated: 10 August 1992
- Architect(s): E. W. Pugin, Pugin and Pugin
- Architectural type: Church
- Style: Gothic Revival
- Groundbreaking: 1860
- Completed: 1877

Specifications
- Materials: Stone, slate roof

Administration
- Diocese: Shrewsbury

The Church of Our Lady of the Immaculate Conception is in Cavendish Street, Birkenhead, Wirral, Merseyside, England. It is an active Roman Catholic church in the diocese of Shrewsbury. The church is recorded in the National Heritage List for England as a designated Grade II listed building.

== History ==
The church was built between 1860 and 1862 to a design by E. W. Pugin. The chancel was added in 1876–77, and was designed by Pugin and Pugin. A planned steeple was not completed. In 1941 the adjacent presbytery was destroyed by bombs, and there was some damage to the east end of the church. The church was restored in 1951 by Reynolds and Sons.

== Architecture ==
Our Lady's is constructed in stone with Welsh slate roofs. Its plan consists of a nave with a clerestory, north and south aisles – each with two projecting confessionals, a south west porch, an apsidal chancel with lean-to vestries resembling an ambulatory, and a north east tower. At the west end are paired entrances over which is a painted and carved rose in a quatrefoil. Above this is a band of five narrow lancet windows and a large rose window. On the gables are wrought iron cross finials. At the west end of the aisles are paired lancets. Along the sides of the aisles are triple lancet windows in each bay, between which are buttresses. The clerestory windows are wide single lancets. There are more lancet windows at clerestory level around the chancel, with raised letting below. The tower rises only to the height of the eaves. It has a south doorway above which is a niche containing a statue of Mary, on the east side is a rose window, and there is a northeast stair turret.

Inside the church, the reredos of 1895 is by Pugin and Pugin. Lining the apse are two stages of blind arcading, and paintings by Hardman & Co. that were damaged in 1941.

== See also ==
- Listed buildings in Birkenhead
