= Wirral Community Health and Care NHS Foundation Trust =

- Type: NHS foundation trust
- Headquarters: Derby Road; Birkenhead; CH42 0LQ
- Staff: 1,394 (2018/19)
- Website: www.wchc.nhs.uk

Wirral Community Health and Care NHS Foundation Trust is an NHS foundation trust that runs community services in the Wirral. It was established in April 2011. It operates three Wirral walk-in centres in Eastham, Wallasey and at Arrowe Park, the GP out-of-hours service and a minor injuries unit in Wallasey. Two of the walk-in centres were inspected in September 2013 by the Care Quality Commission and both passed all aspects of checks that essential standards of quality and safety were being met.

Services in the area were previously provided by Wirral and West Cheshire Community NHS Trust, and before that by the earlier Wirral Community NHS Trust, which was dissolved in 1997.

It was named by the Health Service Journal as one of the top hundred NHS trusts to work for in 2015. At that time it had 1076 full-time equivalent staff and a sickness absence rate of 4.9%. 78% of staff recommend it as a place for treatment and 60% recommended it as a place to work.

== See also ==
- List of NHS trusts
