= St Catherine's Health Centre =

- Wirral Community Health and Care NHS Foundation Trust
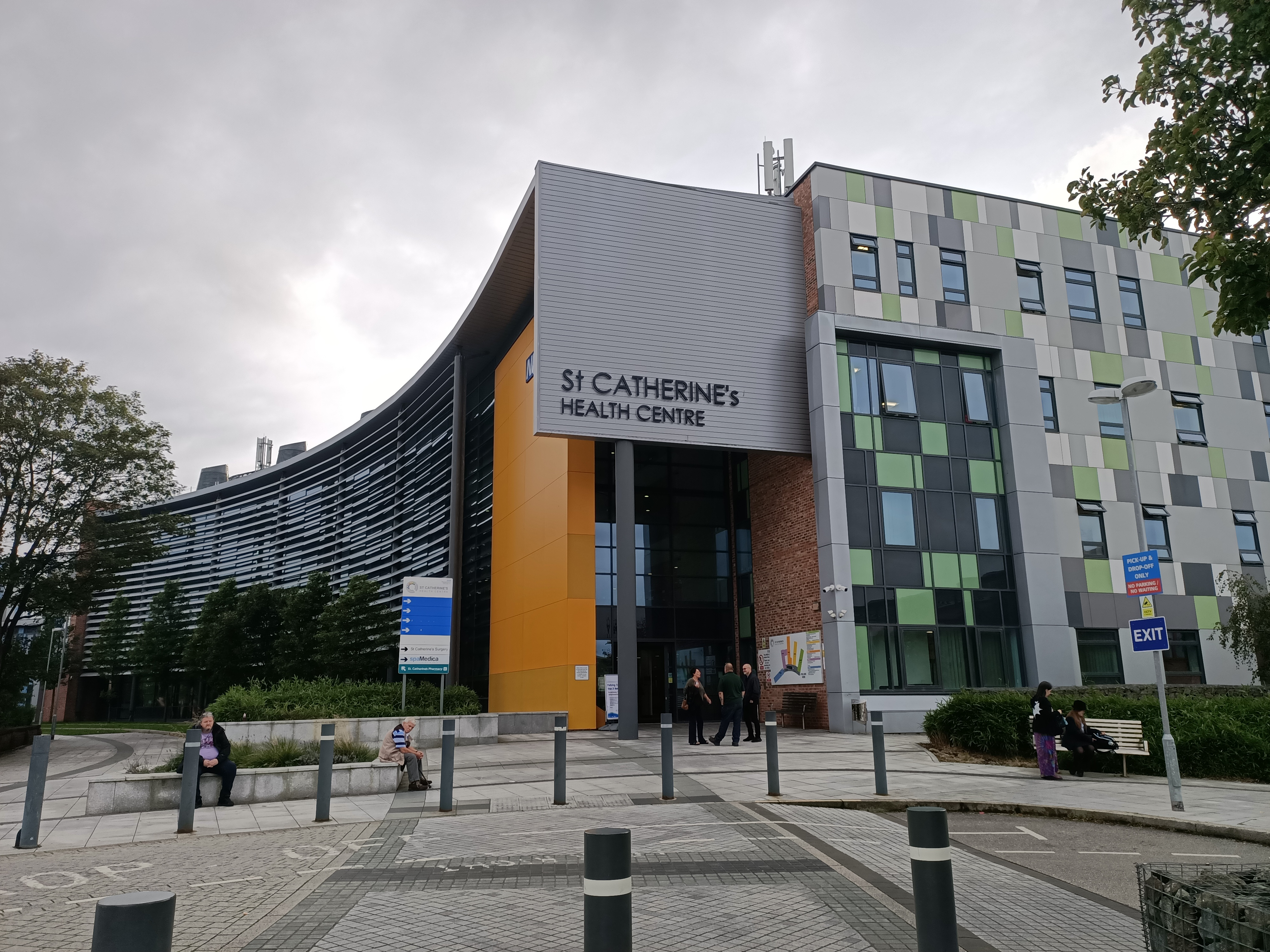
- St Catherine's Health Centre

- Location within Merseyside

Geography
- Location: Tranmere, Birkenhead, Merseyside, England
- Coordinates: 53.3799°N 3.0304°W

History
- Founded: 1863

Links
- Website: www.wirralct.nhs.uk/contact/clinics-a-z/st-catherines
- Lists: Hospitals in England

St Catherine's Health Centre, formerly St Catherine's Hospital, is a community hospital in Tranmere, Birkenhead, England.

St Catherine's is managed by Wirral Community Health and Care NHS Foundation Trust. Some services run from the site are operated by other local trusts.

== History ==
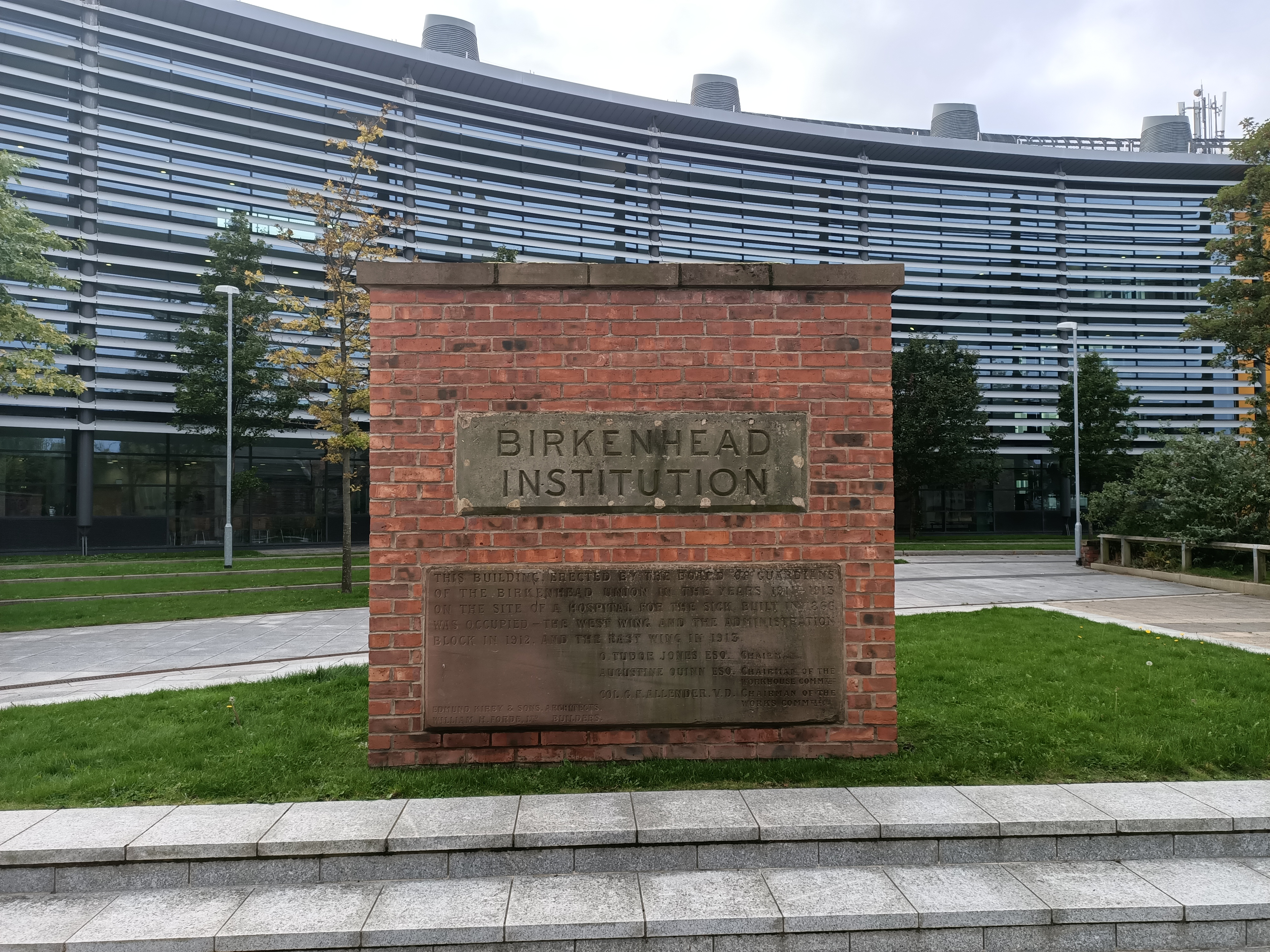
The original entrance sign for the Birkenhead Institution

The hospital has its origins in the Birkenhead Union Workhouse and Infirmary which was designed by Thomas Leyland and completed in 1863. The original hospital was replaced by two new pavilions and an administration block in 1913, and was renamed as the Birkenhead Institution.

The facility became Birkenhead Municipal Hospital in 1930 and then joined the National Health Service as St Catherine's Hospital in 1948.

In 2013, St Catherine's underwent a £32.6 million redevelopment, with the original St Catherine's Hospital buildings replaced with the new, four storey health centre. As part of the redevelopment, the site was renamed St Catherine's Medical Centre.
