= Wirral University Teaching Hospital NHS Foundation Trust =

Multi-hospital NHS trust in England

- Former name: Wirral Hospitals NHS Trust
- Type: Foundation trust with teaching accreditation
- Established: 5 June 1992
- Headquarters: Arrowe Park Hospital, Upton
- Region served: Wirral Peninsula; North West England; North Wales
- Hospitals: Arrowe Park Hospital; Clatterbridge Hospital; Wirral Women and Children's Hospital
- Chair: Steve Igoe
- Chief executive: Janelle Holmes
- Website: www.wuth.nhs.uk

Wirral University Teaching Hospital NHS Foundation Trust, initialised as WUTH, is a multi-hospital NHS trust with teaching accreditation and foundation trust status on the Wirral Peninsula, England, providing healthcare for this and surrounding areas of North West England and North Wales.

The trust is responsible for three hospitals within two sites: Arrowe Park Hospital and Wirral Women and Children's Hospital in the main site; and Clatterbridge Hospital in Clatterbridge Health Park, a site which the trust occupies along with two other NHS trusts and three non-NHS organisations. It also provides some services at St Catherine's Health Centre, Tranmere and Victoria Central Health Centre, Wallasey.

Haris Sultan the youngest ever NHS Non-Executive Director in the country is a NED at WUTH.

== History ==
The Trust was established by The Wirral Hospital National Health Service Trust (Establishment) Order 1990, coming into force on 21 December 1990. It received ownership of health assets from Wirral Health Authority, including sites at Arrowe Park and Clatterbridge, as a result of The Wirral Hospital National Health Service Trust (Transfer of Trust Property) Order 1992, coming into force on 5 June 1992.

Prior to gaining teaching accreditation and authorisation as a Foundation Trust status in 2007, the trust was known as Wirral Hospital NHS Trust.

The Wirral Women and Children's Hospital was founded in 2011 following redevelopment of the maternity annexe on the Arrowe Park campus.

== Performance ==
=== NHS Improvement (including Monitor) ===
In March 2012, Monitor (the financial regulator of NHS England prior to NHS Improvement), found the trust was "persistently failing" the 18-week waiting time target. It also had concerns about the way the board was run. Chief executive, Len Richards, had already left the trust in August 2011 following a vote of no confidence. His replacement, David Allison, joined the trust in April 2012. Since Mr Richards' departure, all of the previous Executive Board members have left. The last, Sue Green (director of human resources), was made redundant following a restructure of the senior management team.

In February 2013, Monitor reported that "significant improvements" had been made in reducing waiting times for patients needing routine surgery with the Trust consistently achieving the standard for referring patients for treatment within 18 weeks. Monitor also recognised the "important improvements" made by the Board of Directors in the way the Trust is run and engages with clinical staff. As a result of this Monitor concluded in February 2013 that the Trust was longer in breach of its terms of authorisation. In November 2013, Monitor opened a new investigation into the trust's financial performance. That investigation was concluded in 2014, with the report from March of that year noting that "the trust is working hard to address our concerns about its finances and these improvements are already happening".

=== CQC ===
In December 2013, the Care Quality Commission published a report into satisfaction of maternity services across England. Wirral Women and Children's Hospital was named in the Top 7 in England and the No 1 in North West England for patient care.

In January 2014, the Care Quality Commission published a report into the standards of care at Arrowe Park Hospital. The report stated that the hospital had met all six measures for delivering 'standards you have a right to expect' in hospital care.

=== A&E performance ===
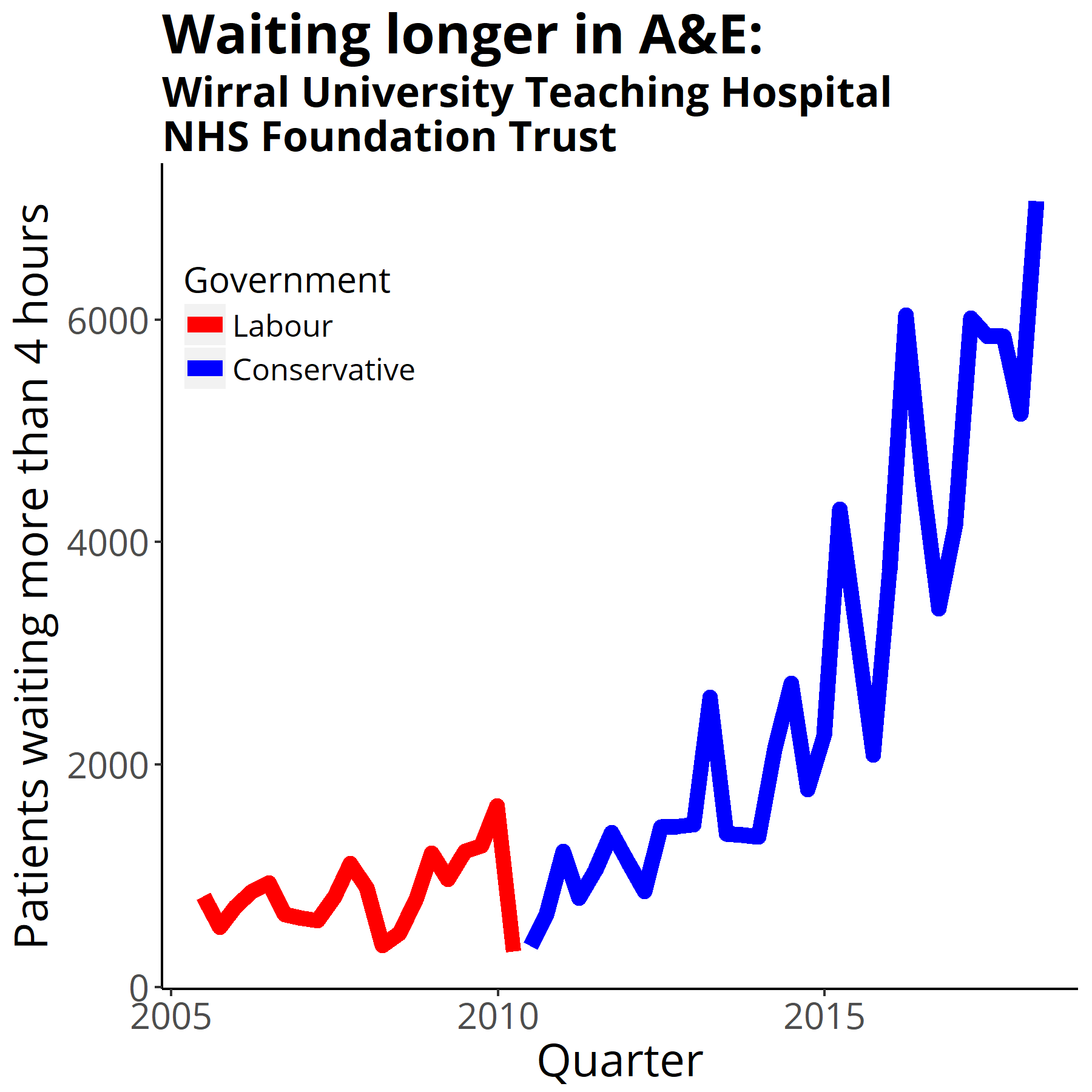
Four-hour target in the emergency department quarterly figures from NHS England Data from https://www.england.nhs.uk/statistics/statistical-work-areas/ae-waiting-times-and-activity/

In March 2018 it was the sixteenth worst performer in A&E in England, with only 63.2% of patients in the main A&E seen within 4 hours.

== Management ==
In May 2014 Frank Field MP alleged that close relationships between senior members of the Wirral Clinical Commissioning Group (CCG) and the Trust may have dented the "independence" and "integrity" of local health services. Writing to the Secretary of State that "Arrowe Park [sic] has a long history of not being able properly to manage its budget. It regularly looks around for further funds to which it demands almost immediate access but is unprepared to make any efforts at reforming its own practices. Closures, sackings and loss of patient services has been its traditional negative stance. The CCG therefore has the near impossible task of winning reform in the face of these negotiating tactics."

As a result of this complaint, NHS England launched a Capability and Governance review of the Wirral Clinical Commissioning Group. Published in August 2014; the review found evidence of a "poor relationship between the CCG and Wirral University Teaching Hospital Foundation Trust". As result, both the Chair of the CCG, and the CCG's Chief Clinical Officer resigned in December 2014; having already voluntarily stepped aside in the May of that year.

In December 2017 David Allison, the chief executive, left with immediate effect after four executive directors had complained to NHS Improvement about the misrepresentation of executives’ views to governors and a culture of staff not speaking up because they believed the trust chair Michael Carr was unwilling to act. A subsequent NHSI investigation was carried out which identified governance issues and a breakdown of communication between all elements of the Board. Palaniappan Saravanan, a consultant cardiologist was dismissed for gross misconduct in November 2017.

In February 2018 Dr John Coakley, who was formerly medical director at Homerton University Hospital NHS Foundation Trust, resigned as a non-executive director, a position to which he was appointed in July 2017. It was reported that "There has been a total and complete breakdown of relationships and governance".

== Global Digital Exemplar ==
In September 2016, the trust was selected by NHS England as one of twelve Global Digital Exemplars.

== See also ==
- List of NHS trusts
