= Clatterbridge Hospital =

Hospital in Merseyside, England

- Wirral University Teaching Hospital NHS Foundation Trust
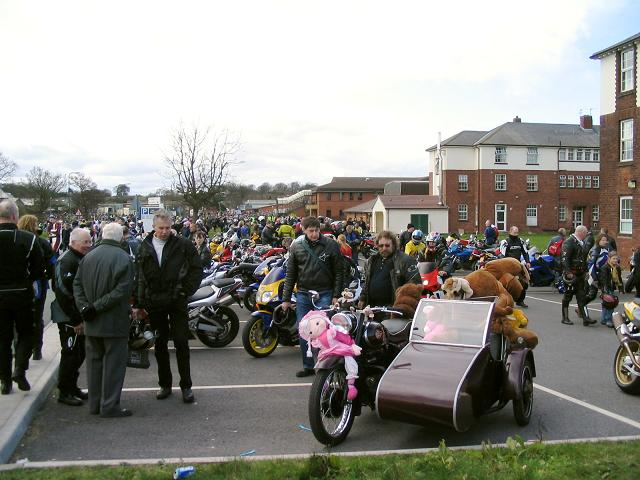
- Clatterbridge Hospital in 2004

- Shown in Merseyside

Geography
- Location: Clatterbridge Road, Bebington, Wirral. CH63 4JY., United Kingdom
- Coordinates: 53.333195°N 3.024193°W

Organisation
- Care system: Public NHS
- Type: General/Teaching
- Affiliated university: University of Liverpool School of Medical Education

Services
- Emergency department: No Accident & Emergency

History
- Founded: c.1830 as a workhouse, 1930 as a general hospital.

Links
- Website: www.wuth.nhs.uk
- Lists: Hospitals in the United Kingdom

Clatterbridge Hospital is a general hospital located on Clatterbridge Health Park in Bebington, Wirral, England. It is managed by Wirral University Teaching Hospital NHS Foundation Trust.

== History ==
The hospital has its origins in the accommodation provided for the treatment of infectious diseases for the Wirral Poor Law Union Workhouse in 1888. A purpose built infirmary block was erected in 1899.

In 1930, with the end of the workhouse system, the site became the responsibility of Cheshire County Council who renamed the facility Clatterbridge General Hospital. With an increased catchment area expansion of the infirmary was ordered, including a new surgical block and an extension to the existing maternity block. After it joined the National Health Service in 1948, it became simply Clatterbridge Hospital.

A Regional Radiotherapy Centre, now known as the Clatterbridge Cancer Centre, was established on the site and opened by Lord Cohen in 1958.

Following the opening of Arrowe Park Hospital in 1982, many of the overlapping services closed at Clatterbridge in favour of the newer site, including accident and emergency and maternity. In 1992 the local health authorities were abolished and management of Clatterbridge Hospital passed to the newly founded Wirral Hospitals NHS Trust. Although the last of the old workhouse buildings were demolished in 1997, clinical services continue to be provided at the hospital.
