= Community diagnostic centre =

English health clinic

Community diagnostic centres were introduced into the English NHS in 2021 as part of the response to the COVID-19 pandemic in England. The intention was to make tests more easily available, reduce visits to hospitals and reduce patient travel. Sir Mike Richards conducted a review of diagnostic services as part of the NHS Long Term Plan and this was one of his recommendations. There were 40 centres included in the first wave. £2.3 billion was committed to the programme.

MRI scanners, ultrasound, X-ray, breast screening, phlebotomy and bone density scans are available services. Some are in community settings such as shopping centres and football stadiums, but some are actually on hospital or GP surgery sites. Only 20% are actually “in the community”. The King’s Fund said the centres had “much to learn” from the Covid-19 vaccination programme where people were easily able to access a vaccination centre in places “convenient and familiar”, such as churches and temples. They pointed out that the standard that patients should wait less than six weeks for a diagnostic test had not been met since February 2017. The NHS conducts around a billion diagnostic tests a year in England. The number of colonoscopies and MRI scans increased between 4% and 7% in the three years to 2018/19 and this trend is expected to continue.

In April 2022, 73 centres were operating, said to be providing 30,000 additional tests a week, and the aspiration was to have 160 CDCs up and running by 2025. This was actually an average of only 411 tests per week per centre. Shortages of qualified staff impacted on the programme. By September 2022 92 centres were operating and they were said to have delivered 1.7 million tests, checks and scans. Steve Barclay was promoting them vigorously as "helping to bust the COVID backlogs." In October 2022 they were said to have delivered over 2 million tests, checks and scans since July 2021.
