= Arrowe Park Hospital =

Hospital in Wirral, Merseyside, United Kingdom

- Wirral University Teaching Hospital NHS Foundation Trust
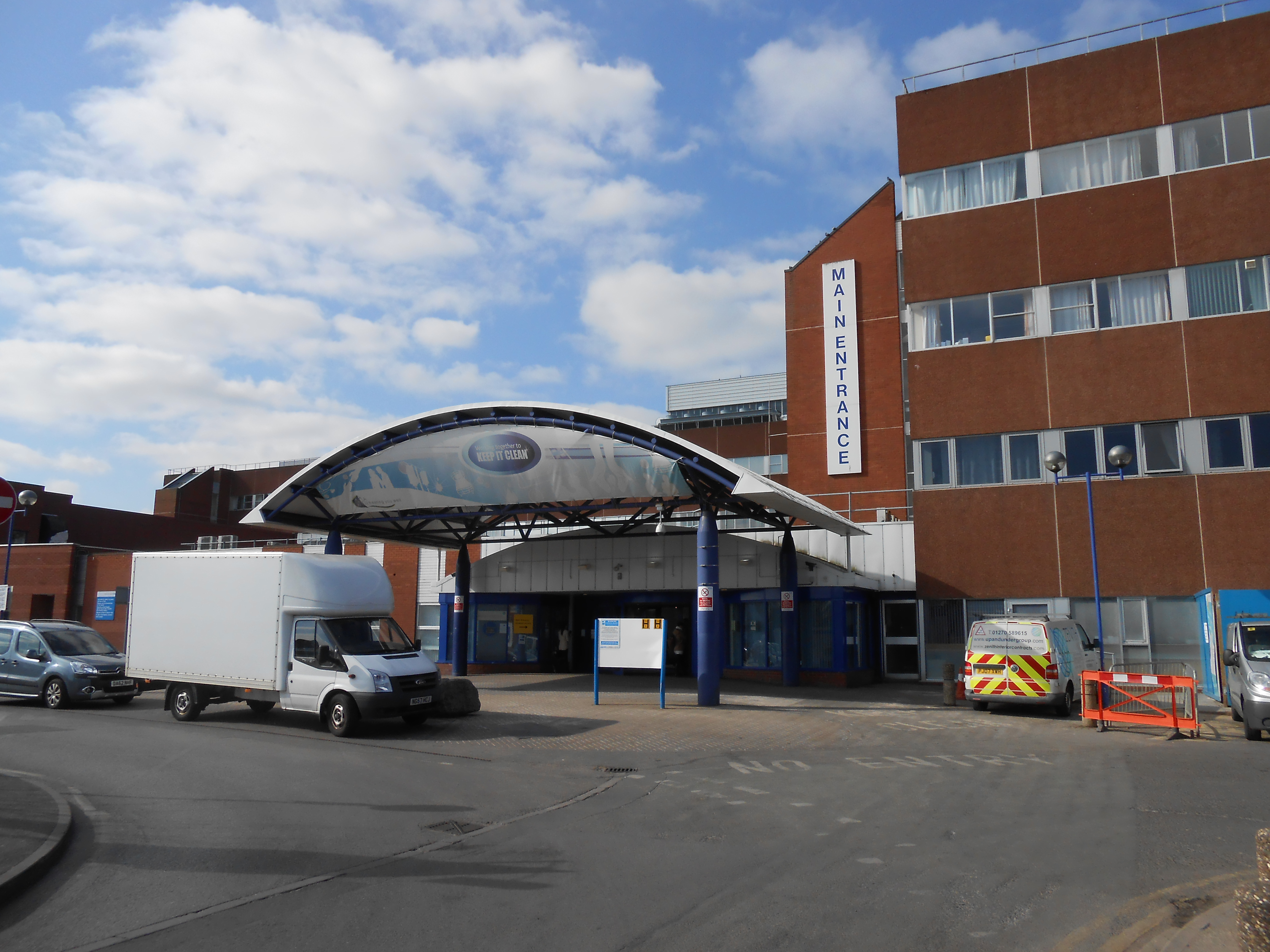
- Main Entrance at Arrowe Park Hospital in 2013

- Shown in Merseyside

Geography
- Location: Arrowe Park Road, Upton, Wirral. Merseyside CH49 5PE, United Kingdom
- Coordinates: 53.369876°N 3.095984°W

Organisation
- Care system: Public NHS
- Type: Acute/Teaching
- Affiliated university: University of Liverpool School of Medicine

Services
- Emergency department: Yes Accident & Emergency;
- Beds: 800

History
- Founded: 1982

Links
- Website: www.wuth.nhs.uk
- Lists: Hospitals in the United Kingdom

Arrowe Park Hospital is a large, acute hospital, located on a 15-acre (6.1 ha) section of Arrowe Park, close to the village of Upton, Wirral, Merseyside. It is one of three hospitals managed by Wirral University Teaching Hospital NHS Foundation Trust, the others being Clatterbridge Hospital and Wirral Women and Children's Hospital, the latter of which is also based on the Arrowe Park site.

Preliminary inspection by the Care Quality Commission rated the hospital as requiring improvement.

== History ==
=== Early history ===
Planning for Arrowe Park Hospital began in the 1960s, although building did not start until the early 1970s. The facility was built to replace Birkenhead General Hospital in Birkenhead, Highfield Maternity Hospital in Wallasey, Leasowe Hospital in Leasowe, St Catherine's Hospital in Birkenhead and Victoria Central Hospital in Wallasey. The hospital was officially opened by the Queen on 4 May 1982.

=== Twenty-first century ===
In March 2011, following remodelling work at a cost of £11.5 million, the maternity and gynaecology unit was renamed Wirral Women and Children's Hospital.

In January 2020, the hospital was designated the quarantine site for British nationals evacuated from China at the start the COVID-19 pandemic. The British nationals from Wuhan were all released from quarantine after 14 days and none became ill.

In November 2024, the trust announced a major incident at the hospital "for cyber security reasons", resulting in the cancellation of outpatient appointments. The attack was expected to result in delays in the provision of emergency medical care.

In May 2026, following the hantavirus outbreak aboard, 20 British passengers and crew from the cruise ship MV Hondius were taken to Arrowe Park to isolate for three days. A German and a Japanese national were also taken to the hospital for the same reason. Arrowe Park was chosen because it was good for isolating, and in close proximity to specialist facilities such as the Tropical and Infectious Diseases Unit at Royal Liverpool University Hospital, and the Liverpool School of Tropical Medicine.

In August 2026, the trust opened its new urgent treatment and emergency care unit, which co-locates both A&E and the urgent care centre. This means that adult and paediatric patients seeking urgent or emergency health care at Arrowe Park Hospital will use the same single point of arrival. Work on the new centre began in 2022.
