= Royal Liverpool and Broadgreen University Hospitals NHS Trust =

NHS hospital trust

Coordinates: 53.411°N 2.929°W

- Type: Hospital trust
- Disbanded: 30 September 2019
- Region served: Merseyside
- Establishments: Royal Liverpool University Hospital; Broadgreen Hospital; Liverpool University Dental Hospital
- Budget: over £400m
- Chair: Mike Eastwood (interim)
- Chief executive: Peter Williams (interim)
- Website: www.rlbuht.nhs.uk

The Royal Liverpool and Broadgreen University Hospitals NHS Trust was an NHS Trust in Liverpool. It managed the Royal Liverpool University Hospital, Broadgreen Hospital and Liverpool University Dental Hospital.

== History ==
The trust was formed in April 1995 from the merger of Broadgreen Hospital NHS Trust and Royal Liverpool University Hospitals NHS Trust.

The trust was the first UK organisation to adopt the Medworxx clinical utilisation management system in November 2011. By January 2012 the proportion of elective patients ready to leave had reduced from 5.4% to 4.6%, while non-electives had reduced from more than 7% to 5.8%. The trust won the National EHealth Insider Award in the category of “Outstanding work in IT-enabled change in healthcare” for their project titled “First UK IT Enabled Hospital Case Management System” in October 2012.

Between 2010 and 2014 the number of doctors employed at the trust has gone up from 633 to 788 (24.5%), while the number of managers is down from 248 to 237 (4.4%).

The trust is engaged in a major building project to replace the present hospital building with a new hospital with 18 theatres, 23 wards and 646 single bedrooms which is now largely built and was due to open in 2017. It is financed partly by a £100 million capital contribution from the government and partly by lonas and equity raised by a private finance initiative private sector company selected in a public sector run tender process. The PFI project company, The Hospital Company (Liverpool) Ltd will pay interest, from when the hospital is opened, at a rate of 4.9% on two long-term loans (c 32 years maturity) of £90 million each from the European Investment Bank and Legal & General. This project company is owned and controlled by Aberdeen Asset Management and Carillion and its obligations are set in a long-term contract with the trust. Carillion was also paid a fee of £10.6 million for arranging the finance and developing the plans for the hospital. Negotiations started in 2018 to agree a basis to complete the fitting out of the new hospital, and any necessary rectification work, following the collapse of Carillion in early 2018. On 26 October 2018 Laing O'Rourke was confirmed as the contractor to complete the project.

The trust paid an extra £20,000 in June 2012 to former chair Judith Greensmith and an extra £5,000 each to its non-executive directors to reflect work they did in relation to a foundation trust bid and the major redevelopment. the trust had obtained legal advice from law firm Hill Dickinson, which said the payments would exceed the levels permitted by the National Health Service Act 2006. In May 2015 The trust accepted that it did not have the authority to make these additional payments.

In September 2016, the trust was selected by NHS England as one of twelve Global Digital Exemplars.

It merged with the Aintree University Hospitals NHS Foundation Trust to form the Liverpool University Hospitals NHS Foundation Trust on 1 October 2019.

== Performance ==
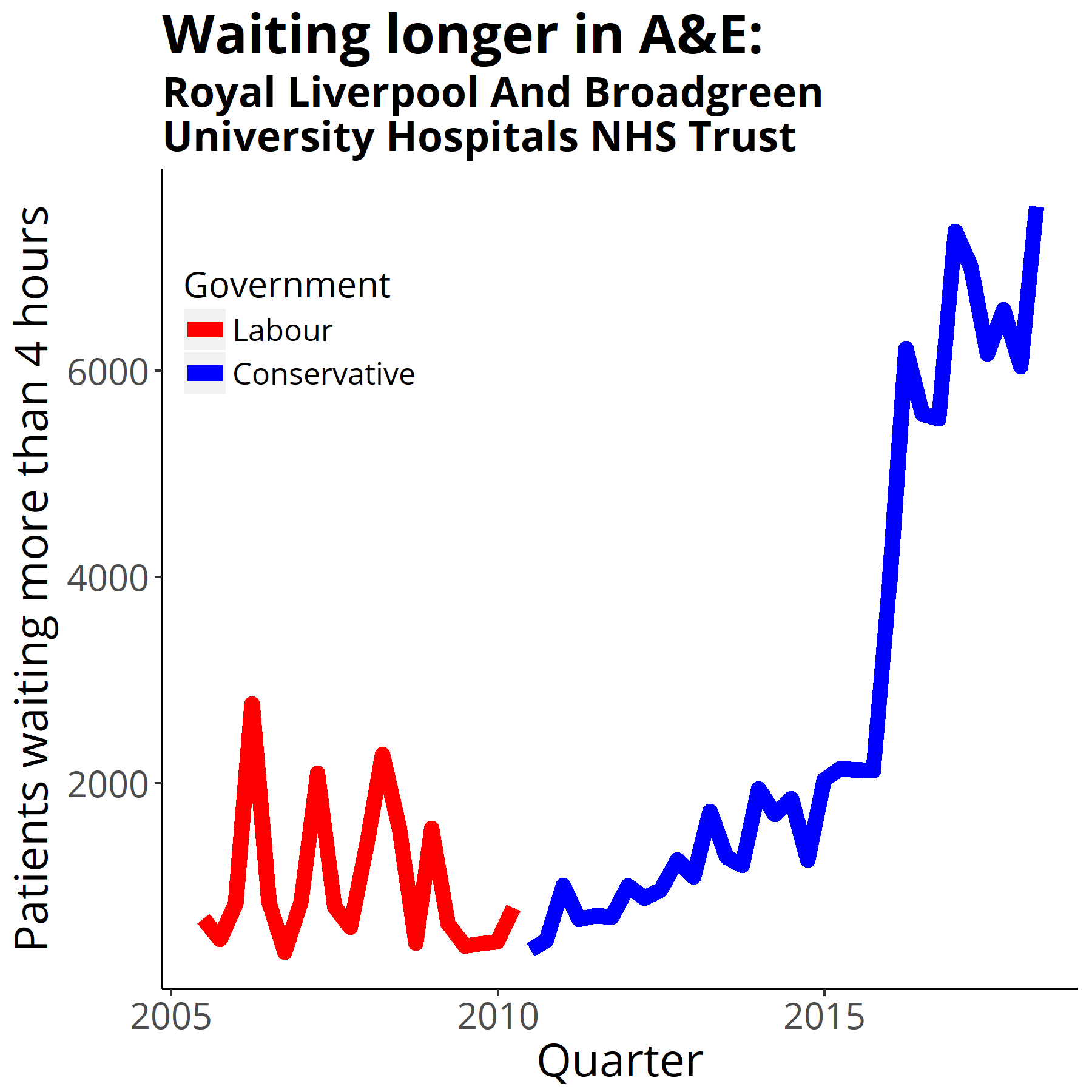
Royal Liverpool And Broadgreen University Hospitals NHS Trust A&E performance 2005-18

In March 2018 it was the nineteenth worst performer in A&E in England, with only 60.2% of patients in the main A&E seen within 4 hours.

== See also ==
- Healthcare in Liverpool
- List of NHS trusts
