= Liverpool Women's NHS Foundation Trust =

Liverpool Women's NHS Foundation Trust runs Liverpool Women's Hospital, a major obstetrics, gynaecology and neonatology research hospital in Liverpool, England. It is one of several specialist hospitals located within the Liverpool City Region; alongside Alder Hey Children's Hospital, Liverpool Heart and Chest Hospital, the Walton Centre, Mersey Regional Burns and Plastic Surgery Unit, and Clatterbridge Cancer Centre.

== History ==
In 1985 three hospitals, the Women's Hospital in Catharine Street, Liverpool Maternity Hospital, and Mill Road Maternity Hospital, joined under the management of the Liverpool Obstetric and Gynaecology Unit. This management unit became an NHS trust in 1992 and changed its title to the Liverpool Women's Hospital NHS Trust in 1994. The Trust took over the Aintree centre for women's health in 2000.

== Funded research ==
Bliss, the special care baby charity are currently funding research at Liverpool Women's Hospital into parenteral nutrition for premature and sick babies.

Other funded research projects at the Trust include;

• the LAMB (Liverpool Archive of MRI in Babies) study looks to use MRI scans to understand how nutrition and medicines affect the development of the brain, liver and hips in new born babies.

• the TINN (Treat Infections in Neonates) study aims to find more information about the antibiotic ciprofloxacin including safety, most effective dose and other factors that may influence the way babies respond to the drug. This information may help other babies in future.

• TINN 2 (Treat Infection in Neonates 2) aims to carry out an evaluation of the antibiotic azithromycin for the treatment of infections in preterm and term neonates.

• Detection of Genomic Structural Variations using Next Generation DNA Sequencing is a study that will examine potential benefits of a new technology called 'next-generation DNA sequencing' to detect changes in chromosomes. These changes are often the cause of developmental delay, learning difficulties, birth defects and other problems. We hope that in the future, next generation DNA sequencing will be able to provide a diagnosis for more patients with genetic disorders. It could provide information to help their doctors to manage their care and also help with genetic counselling for their families. The trust has one of the 11 Genomics Medicines Centres associated with Genomics England which will open across England in February 2014. All the data produced in the 100,000 Genomes project will be made available to drugs companies and researchers to help them create precision drugs for future generations.

• Baby Skin Care Research Programme: randomised, assessor-blinded controlled trial comparing an infant skin-cleansing product with water in infants.

• Fit for Birth: The aim of this project is to improve the care of pregnant women in Liverpool so that there are fewer complications during pregnancy and improvements in long-term health.

• Does metformin reduce excess birthweight in offspring of obese pregnant women? A randomised controlled trial of efficacy, exploration of mechanism and evaluation of other pregnancy complications.

== Private work ==
In April 2014 it emerged that the Trust planned to do more private work. It would offer breast augmentation, tummy tucks, chemical peels, nose reshaping, liposuction, eyelid reduction and botox. Kathryn Thomson the chief executive said "the austerity measures mean we have to be more innovative and creative and I do believe there can be a healthy partnership between the NHS and private medicine. This private care would go somewhere, these are people who are able to pay for private health care, why not do it here with the benefit going back into the public purse and benefiting NHS patients? We are fundamentally an NHS trust but we've got to be creative and find ways to keep what I think is an absolutely fantastic hospital viable and affordable and to maintain the standard I believe patients should expect when they visit us. All that comes down to money and if that means taking money from the private sector and recycling it in the NHS, I think that's the right thing to do. "

== Hewitt Fertility Centre ==
The Trust runs the Hewitt Fertility Centre, in Liverpool and Knutsford, which carries out 2,500 cycles of in-vitro fertilisation for public and private patients a year and employs 60 staff. It claims that Central Manchester University Hospitals NHS Foundation Trust had achieved a pregnancy rate of just 21 per cent for the under-35s in 2012, the lowest pregnancy rate in the UK, whereas the centre was "currently achieving a success rate of 57 per cent". It emerged in April 2014 that the Trust was considering an expansion into the Middle East.

== Prospects ==
In March 2015 the trust forecast a deficit of £2.1 million and saw no way of reducing that in future, because, Kathryn Thomson, the Chief Executive said, " the way the payment system in the NHS works does not provide our maternity services with the level of income that is required to afford the workforce." The trust is unusual in specialising in maternity services. Other trusts subsidise maternity from payments made by other services. It is not clear how the Trust could survive as an independent organisation. The projected future deficit continues to increase.

New arrangements by the NHS Litigation Authority mean that the trust has to pay for claims related to cases dating back to 2001. It is liable to a group action expected to cost £35m in respect of claims made by around 360 women who said mistakes by urogynaecologist George Rowland at the Aintree Centre for Women's Health between 2001 and 2008 had made their incontinence worse. This means that the trust is no longer financially viable.

In 2017 the Liverpool Clinical Commissioning Group decided that the best prospect was to move the trust to the rebuilt Royal Liverpool University Hospital in the city centre and merge the two organisations. On the existing site they said that patients were at risk because of lack of a full range of imaging services, the lack of a blood bank, the lack of level three adult critical care services onsite and poor access to colorectal surgery. This proposal was opposed by the Save Liverpool Women's Hospital Campaign.

== See also ==
- Liverpool Knowledge Quarter
- List of hospitals in England
- List of NHS trusts
