= Aintree University Hospitals NHS Foundation Trust =

Former UK health provider

Aintree University Hospitals NHS Foundation Trust was a British public sector healthcare provider responsible for managing the Aintree University Hospital in Fazakerley, Liverpool, England.

It was established on 1 November 1991 as Aintree Hospitals National Health Service Trust, and authorised as an NHS foundation trust under the name Aintree University Hospitals NHS Foundation Trust on 1 August 2006.

It merged with the Royal Liverpool and Broadgreen University Hospitals NHS Trust to form the Liverpool University Hospitals NHS Foundation Trust on 1 October 2019.

On 1 November 2024, Aintree University Hospital became part of NHS University Hospitals of Liverpool Group, when Liverpool University Hospitals NHS Foundation Trust and Liverpool Women's Hospital NHS Foundation Trust came together to create the hospital group.

== History ==
In October 2015 the Trust Board agreed to pursue the possibility of a merger with the Royal Liverpool and Broadgreen University Hospitals NHS Trust.

In December 2017 the Health Service Journal reported that the two acute Trusts will appoint an interim joint board by the middle of 2018, and aim to formally merge by April 2019.

== Facilities ==
The Walton Centre for Neurology and Neurosurgery has been based at Aintree University Hospital since 1998.

In 2013, Aintree became the first NHS organisation to become UKAS accredited under the Royal College of Physicians' (RCP) Improving Quality in Physiological diagnostic Services (IQIPS) programme for its Audiology services.

== Performance ==
In October 2013 as a result of the Keogh Review the Trust was put into the highest risk category by the Care Quality Commission.

In December 2013 the Trust was one of thirteen hospital trusts named by Dr Foster Intelligence as having higher than expected higher mortality indicator scores for the period April 2012 to March 2013 in their Hospital Guide 2013. The same report highlighted that the hospital's HSMR mortality indicator was better than expected. The hospital has said that both indicators need to be considered to give a rounded picture and that a mortality reduction programme is underway.

The Summary Hospital-level Mortality Indicator (SHMI) reports on mortality at trust level across the NHS in England using a standard and transparent methodology. It is produced and published quarterly as a national statistic by NHS Digital. The mortality figures for Aintree in January 2018 show that since April 2014 the SHMI for Aintree has been "as expected" throughout this time period. Work which was commenced following the first publication of SHMI (for 2012–13) has been continued and has reduced the SHMI since that time.

Aintree was named "Large Employer of the Year" in the regional finals of the 2013 National Apprenticeship Awards. The hospital was also listed in the 2013 Top 100 Apprenticeship Employers list, which is produced by the National Apprenticeship Service and City & Guilds.

Aintree's staff flu immunisation campaign for 2013-14 was the best in the country. More than 83% of frontline staff had the flu jab before the campaign officially closed on 31 January 2014, the highest figure in the country.

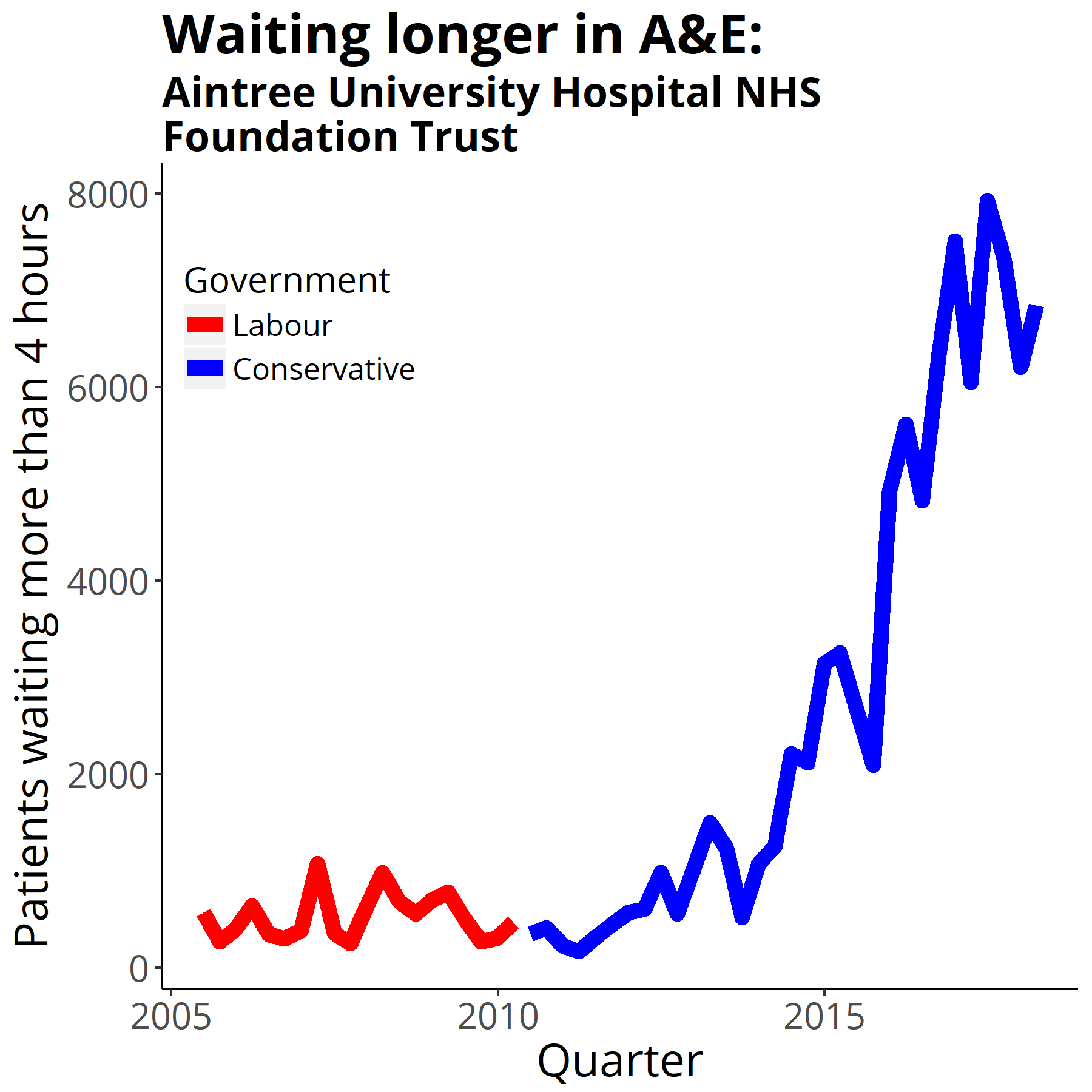
Four-hour target in the emergency department quarterly figures from NHS England Data from https://www.england.nhs.uk/statistics/statistical-work-areas/ae-waiting-times-and-activity/

The trust was one of 26 responsible for half of the national growth in patients waiting more than four hours in accident and emergency over the 2014/5 winter. The trust was well below target for seeing A&E patients promptly, it was slightly below target for planned operations and care but was above target for cancer care.

The Care Quality Commission's most recent report, from September 2016, rated the Trust as Good overall.

== See also ==
- Healthcare in Liverpool
- List of hospitals in England
- List of NHS trusts
