= Healthcare in Merseyside =

Healthcare in Merseyside reflects the unique historical legacy of the region. The main city, Liverpool, had five of the most deprived areas in the country in 2012 according to a Church Urban Fund report. According to then-city Mayor Joe Anderson, "The people in Calderstones, Woolton, and Childwall outlive the people in other areas of Liverpool, like parts of north Liverpool, by 10 to 12 years or so".

== History ==
Liverpool's Health of the Town Committee appointed Thomas Fresh as 'Inspector of Nuisances' on 4 September 1844 The city appointed its first medical officer of health, William Henry Duncan, in 1847. In 1851, a boy born in inner Liverpool had a life expectancy of only 26 years

== Management structures ==
Liverpool has had unstable administrative arrangements with the North West region, and in particular with Manchester since the establishment of the NHS. In 1946 drawing the boundary between the Liverpool and Manchester regional hospital boards proved to be particularly difficult because of "the jealousy felt by Liverpool for Manchester and the reluctance of Preston to consider any scheme centred on Liverpool or Manchester."

NHS North West was established as a strategic health authority in 2006. It had oversight of 24 primary care trusts, 23 acute trusts, 8 mental health trusts, 7 specialist trusts, as well as the North West Ambulance Service. In October 2011 NHS North West, alongside NHS Yorkshire and Humberside and NHS North East became a part of the NHS North of England SHA cluster – a temporary administrative merger to manage the North of England health economy until the planned dissolution of SHAs in March 2013. The authority closed on 31 March 2013 as part of the Health and Social Care Act 2012.

=== Sustainability and transformation plan ===
The Liverpool City Region submitted proposals for greater local control of the NHS and social care in 2015 following developments in Manchester.

Cheshire and Merseyside formed a sustainability and transformation plan area in March 2016 with Louise Shepherd, the chief executive of Alder Hey Children's NHS Foundation Trust as its leader

Plans to merge the four clinical commissioning groups in north Merseyside were rejected by NHS England in September 2020 because they insisted on a single commissioning body for the entire Cheshire and Merseyside system. In October 2021 John Ashton was shortlisted for the position of chair of the Cheshire and Merseyside Integrated Care System. Although he was the highest scoring candidate the board decided not to appoint anyone. David Flory was to continue as interim chair.

== Commissioning ==
The three clinical commissioning groups covering Liverpool, South Sefton, and Southport and Formby, announced plans to merge in March 2017 and were abolished in 2022 when all CCGs in England were replaced with integrated care systems.

== Acute services ==
Liverpool is unusual in having a large number of small specialist NHS trusts. In October 2014 plans were unveiled in the Healthy Liverpool programme, approved by Liverpool Clinical Commissioning Group and supported by the city council which would concentrate services, especially for cancer patients and major trauma at the Royal Liverpool University Hospital. The proposals, which will be subject to public consultation, include:

- improvements in primary care;
- greater access to GPs;
- more support for people to manage their own care;
- better illness prevention;
- some services moving from hospitals into the community;
- changes to some hospital services to improve outcomes and quality.

Dr Fazlani, chair of the CCG said “If we reduced emergency admissions to hospitals by just 11% we would be able to afford an extra one and a half GPs in every practice in the city. This is the virtuous circle we are aiming to create".

There will be fewer hospitals in Liverpool under the Healthy Liverpool plans to shake-up the city's NHS by providing more care in the community. Cardiology services are offered at four or five sites in Liverpool in 2015 but it is proposed that they will be delivered by a single team at one or two sites.

Between 2010 and 2015 hospitals in Merseyside lost a large number of beds, mostly in general hospitals, though there was some increase in specialist hospitals.

Beds available	2015	2010
Arrowe Park & Clatterbridge	760	813
St Helens & Whiston	693	716
Liverpool Heart and Chest	153	148
Alder Hey Children's	206	218
Aintree	672	788
Clatterbridge Cancer Centre	69	84
Liverpool Women's	140	182
Walton Centre	160	134
Royal Liverpool & Broadgreen	802	892
Five Boroughs Partnership	314	339
Southport & Ormskirk	491	502
Mersey Care	632	411
Warrington & Halton	599	643

In 2022 there were discussions on plans to bring six NHS trusts in the city into a £2bn group of hospital providers which could be called the 'United Hospitals of Liverpool' led by David Nigel Dalton the interim chief executive of Liverpool University Hospitals NHS Foundation Trust.

As of 2022, hospital trusts based in Merseyside included the following:

- Liverpool University Hospitals NHS Foundation Trust
- St Helens and Knowsley Teaching Hospitals NHS Trust
- Wirral University Teaching Hospital NHS Foundation Trust
- Alder Hey Children's NHS Foundation Trust
- Clatterbridge Cancer Centre NHS Foundation Trust
- Liverpool Heart and Chest Hospital NHS Foundation Trust
- Liverpool Women's NHS Foundation Trust
- The Walton Centre NHS Foundation Trust

== Community services ==
Liverpool Community Health NHS Trust was the main NHS provider, but its contract, valued at £81.7 million was taken over by Mersey Care NHS Foundation Trust in November 2017.

A government-funded initiative, More Independent, is being piloted across four UK regions, of which Liverpool is one. It offers gadgets – life enhancing technologies – designed to help people who use NHS or social services live more independently, monitor their health, make everyday life simpler, and help them stay in touch with their family or careers.

Liverpool is the site of Europe’s first dedicated 5G health and social care pilot, Liverpool 5G Health and Social Care, which is based in Kensington, Liverpool and is testing eleven new technologies. These include Safehouse Sensors, which are installed in homes of vulnerable people to detect falls, changes in temperature and unusual behaviour patterns and PAMAN, a video link to a local pharmacy which helps people to take medicines at home safely. The technical infrastructure is provided by Blu Wireless Technology. It uses existing fibre and equipment erected on street furniture like lampposts. It was given an additional £4.3 million in August 2020 to develop a private independent 5G network for health and social care services in selected areas of Liverpool. This is to include a medical grade device to manage and monitor health conditions remotely, an app to teach anxiety reduction techniques, a remote GP triaging service, wound care and management and sensor technology.

== Primary care ==
Out-of-hours services are provided by Urgent Care 24 Limited.

Dharmana's family and general practice, in Walton was put in special measures by the Care Quality Commission in January 2015 after being rated "inadequate". In October 2015 it was closed. SSP Health had a contract for the provision of 11 primary care services in Liverpool and 9 in Sefton from 2013 to 2016.

== See also ==
- Category:Health in Liverpool
- Healthcare in the United Kingdom
