= Rex Makin =

English solicitor and philanthropist

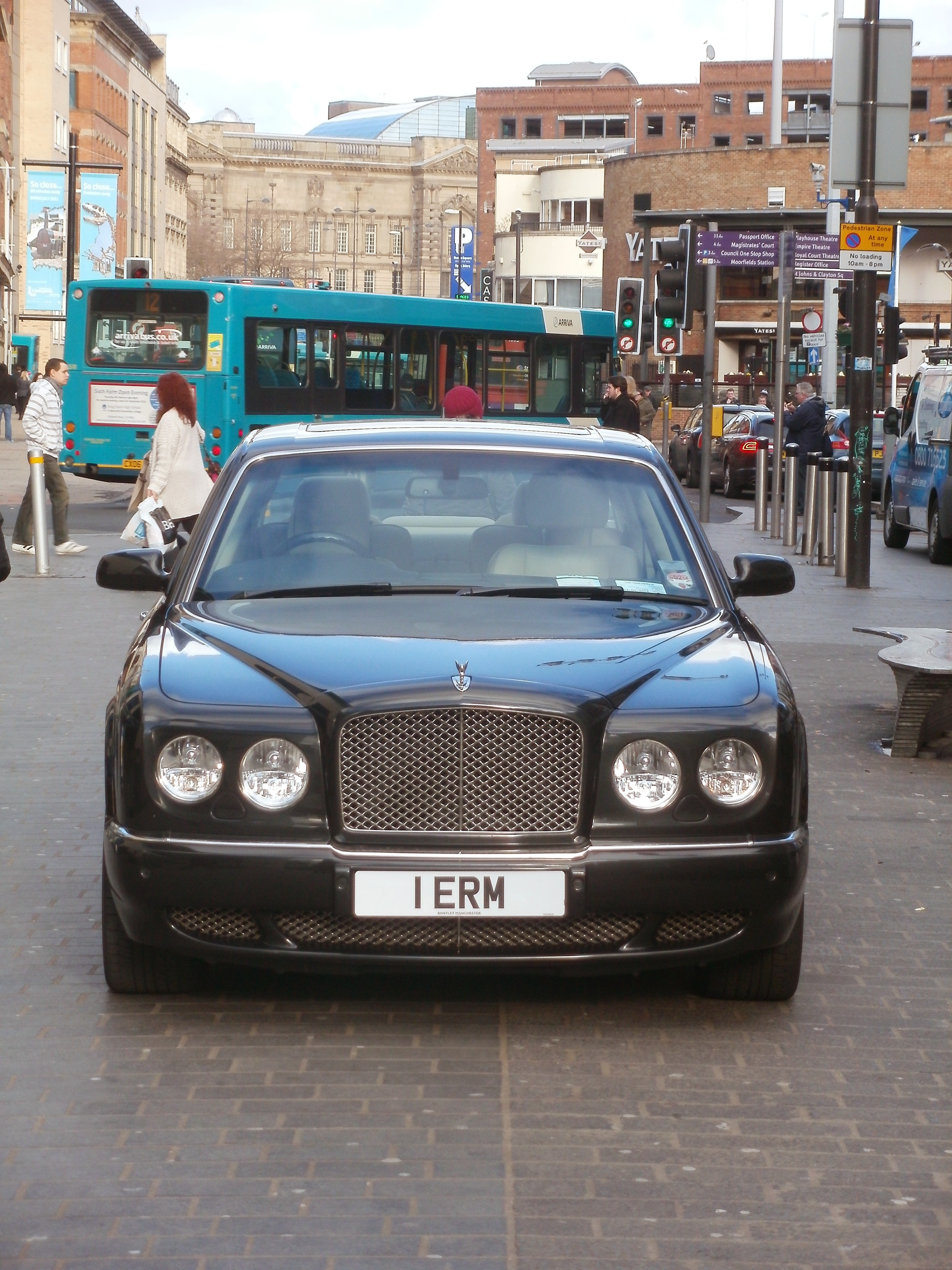
Makin's car outside his office

Elkan Rex Makin (20 August 1925 – 26 June 2017) was a solicitor and philanthropist who practised in Liverpool, England, for over sixty years. He was most noted for his involvement with the Beatles' early career and subsequently high-profile cases such as the Hillsborough and Heysel Stadium disasters, the Walton sextuplets and the re-opening of the Cameo Murder case. A freeman of the City of Liverpool, he also supported the arts and held an honorary professorship at Liverpool John Moores University. He also wrote a weekly column in the Liverpool Echo.

== Early life ==
Born in Birkenhead in 1925, Makin was the only child of Joe and May Makin. His family was Jewish and moved to Liverpool in the 1850s and his great-great grandfather set up shop as a seamens' outfitter in Old Hall Street. His father was brought up on Park Lane in the Chinatown area of Liverpool, where he made and supplied trunks to seamen. Makin studied law at the University of Liverpool, gaining his LL.B in 1945 and LL.M in 1947.

== Career ==
Makin was the family solicitor to Brian Epstein, who in 1963 sought his advice on setting up a perpetually binding contract between himself and the Beatles; however, Makin advised Epstein that such an agreement would be legally indefensible. He has been credited with inventing the term "Beatlemania". Following Epstein's death in 1967, Makin arranged his funeral. Makin was found guilty of gross indecency at Liverpool Magistrates Court and fined £75 in 1982. The Solicitors Disciplinary Tribunal that followed decided not to bar him from practice or any other penalty but expressed its displeasure, reflecting the homophobic sentiments of the time towards LGBT lawyers .

== Honours ==
In 2003 he was appointed a Freeman of the City of Liverpool, the first solicitor to receive that honour. He said at the time

As a lawyer I'm not used to the establishment being nice to me. The ordinary people of Liverpool and I have had a long standing love affair. I've been there in all their disasters and most of their triumphs. This honour fills me with great pride. It recognises my contribution to the cultural and educational life of Liverpool. It is particular gratifying to receive it in the same year as the city was named European Capital of Culture.
