= Broadgreen Hospital =

- Liverpool University Hospitals NHS Foundation Trust and NHS University Hospitals of Liverpool Group
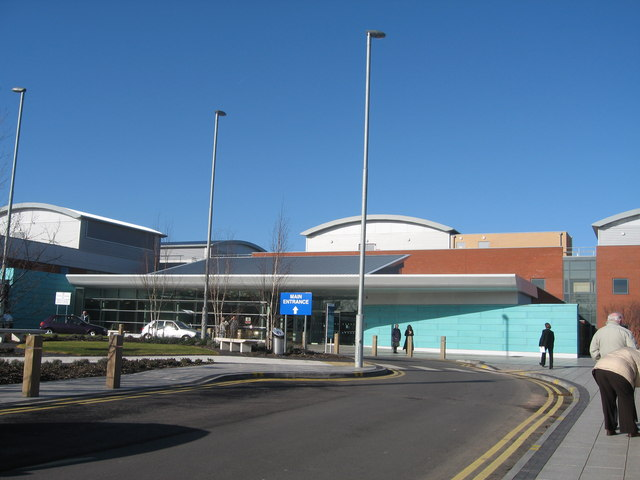
- Shared Broadgreen Hospital and Liverpool Heart and Chest Hospital Entrance

- Location in Merseyside

Geography
- Location: Thomas Drive, Broadgreen, Liverpool, Merseyside, L14 3LB.
- Coordinates: 53.4108°N 2.8986°W

Organisation
- Care system: Public NHS
- Type: Teaching
- Affiliated university: University of Liverpool, Liverpool John Moores University

Services
- Emergency department: No
- Beds: 180
- Speciality: Diagnostic Treatment Centre, Local Anaesthetic Surgical Unit, Orthopaedics, Complex Rehabilitation, Reablement, Dermatology.

Links
- Website: www.uhliverpool.nhs.uk

Broadgreen Hospital is a teaching hospital in the eastern suburb of Broadgreen in the city of Liverpool, England. The hospital, alongside the Royal Liverpool University Hospital and Liverpool University Dental Hospital in the city centre is part of NHS University Hospitals of Liverpool Group.

== History ==
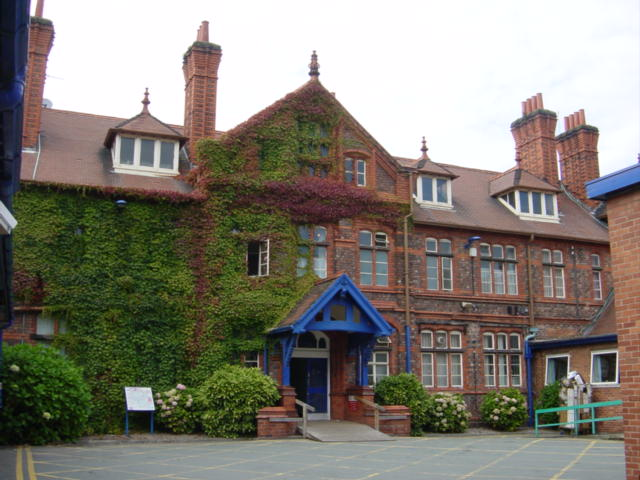
Original entrance, Broadgreen Hospital

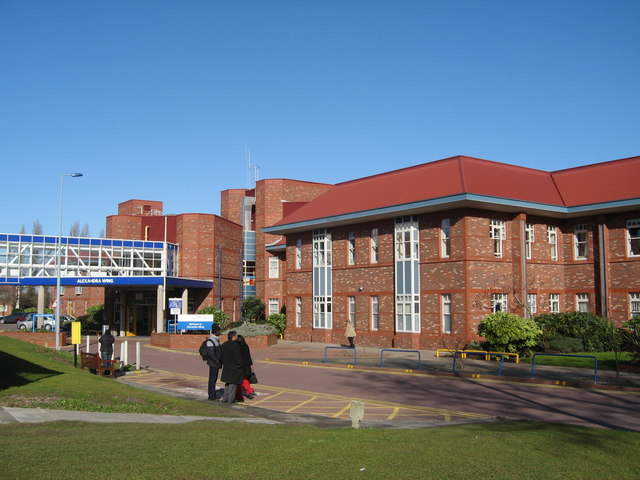
Alexandra Wing, Broadgreen Hospital

The hospital was established as an epileptic home known as the Highfield Infirmary in 1903. It became the Highfield Sanatorium for tuberculosis sufferers in 1922, the Broadgreen Sanatorium in 1929 and, on joining the National Health Service it became the Broadgreen Hospital in 1946. Following a review of local health care provisions within the city in 1989 and the ongoing reforms of the NHS, the local health authority of the time opted to close the accident and emergency department and centralise the facility at the Royal Liverpool University Hospital. Despite fierce opposition at the proposals from members of the public, staff at the hospital and local GP's and politicians - Broadgreen Hospital A&E Department was shut down on a phased basis from 1994, before closing permanently in 1996.

== Notable patients ==
Bill Shankly, the former Liverpool Football Club manager, died at the hospital in September 1981 after suffering a heart attack.

== Facilities ==
Non-clinical facilities provided at the hospital include a café operated by Royal Voluntary Service, free cash points, a restaurant and some vending machines.

== See also ==
- List of hospitals in England
