= Jo Williams =

British administrator and social worker

Dame Josephine Williams DBE DL

Chief executive of Mencap
- In office 2005 – 1 November 2008

Dame Josephine Williams DBE DL (born 8 July 1948), known as Jo Williams, is a British administrator and social worker who was the chief executive of Mencap until 1 November 2008. She chaired the Care Quality Commission between 2010 and 2012.

== Career ==
Josephine Williams was born in Fishpool, Bury, Lancashire. She studied Sociology and Social Studies at Keele University. She changed her name to Williams (the name of her partner) whilst working as principal officer for Cheshire Social Services Department in the 1980s. She progressed in seniority to become second in command before being promoted to Director of Social Services in Wigan. She later returned to Cheshire as Director of Social Services. She was appointed as chief executive of Mencap in 2005 and remained in post until 2008.

Williams was appointed Dame Commander of the Order of the British Empire (DBE) in the 2007 New Year Honours for "services to people with learning disabilities".

An article in The Independent accused Williams of using her authority as head of the CQC to carry out a campaign to smear fellow board member and whistle-blower Kay Sheldon, including commissioning a taxpayer funded psychiatric evaluation of Sheldon.

On 7 September 2012, Dame Jo Williams announced her resignation as Chair of CQC. The CQC chair was forced to apologise to MPs after she reiterated her allegations about Sheldon before a Health Select Committee reviewing CQC accountability.

In May 2014 it was announced that Williams had been appointed as Independent Chair of the East Cheshire Caring Together Executive Board. However, the move was criticised by local councillors at the Cheshire East Council meeting on 14 May after they learned that the council's Health and Wellbeing Scrutiny Committee had not been notified of the appointment. On 15 May, Caring Together announced that Dame Williams and the Caring Together Executive Board had jointly decided that she would not be taking up the role.

Williams became Pro-Chancellor and Chair of Council at Keele University in 2018. She was appointed Chair of the Alder Hey Children's Hospital Trust Board in February 2019.
