= Medworxx =

Software company in Canada

- Industry: software technology
- Founded: 2004
- Headquarters: Toronto, Canada
- Number of locations: 400 hospitals
- Area served: Canada; France; United States; United Kingdom
- Services: health information patient flow public health care system
- Subsidiaries: Lorian Capital Corp

Medworxx is a health information technology company founded in 2004 and currently based in Toronto that supplies services to more than 400 hospitals in Canada, France, the United States and the United Kingdom. It was bought by Aptean in October 2015.

== History ==
Medworxx was incorporated in May 2004 under the laws of Ontario, with three employees; by 2007 the company had grown to around 35 employees. In 2007, it was reported that Lorian Capital Corp. were picking up shares in the company. By September of that year, Medworxx Inc. became a wholly owned subsidiary of the Lorian Capital Corp.

== Patient tracking systems ==
The global-event driven patient tracking system market was valued at $232.7 million in 2014, and is estimated to reach $605.2 million by 2019. Rival companies in this field include Allscripts, Cerner Corporation, Centrallogic, Epic Systems, McKesson Corporation, Sonitor Technologies, and TeleTracking Technologies, Inc.

== Canada ==
In 2010 the company had over 120 hospitals in Canada as its customers. The company's Patient Flow systems provide patient flow analytics in real-time. In 2015 they are used in over 34% of the acute care beds in Canada. The company claims that organisations which use its software show improvements in patient flow. The system was created to be used in a public health care system, and is based on Canada’s current best practice guidelines. It monitors patient stay, care delays, assesses discharge readiness, supports optimal care and standardized process across the health system, offers decision support, and provides operational and trending analysis.

The company formed a partnership with Leidos Health in April 2014. The companies worked together in 2012 implementing the Medworxx Patient Flow Platform for Alberta Health Services. This was part of the first provincial, fully integrated health system in Canada.

== United States ==
The company's patient flow solution Clinical Criteria is to be used in the Crouse Hospital, Syracruse, New York.

== National Health Service ==
Medworxx Patient Flow systems were used by South Tees Hospitals NHS Foundation Trust in a Bed Utilisation Review Project in 2011 across the trust's multiple sites conducted by Model Advice DC Consulting Ltd. The trust subsequently adopted the company's web-based integrated patient flow solution. Royal Liverpool and Broadgreen University Hospitals NHS Trust was the first UK organisation to adopt the Medworxx clinical utilisation management system in November 2011. By January 2012 the proportion of elective patients ready to leave the hospital had reduced from 5.4% to 4.6%, while non-electives had reduced from more than 7% to 5.8%. The trust won the National EHealth Insider Award in the category of "Outstanding work in IT-enabled change in healthcare" for their project titled "First UK IT Enabled Hospital Case Management System" in October 2012. The trust chose the Medworxx clinical utilisation management system as the most suitable for use in conjunction with a case management approach to patient flow. The company claims that its system also helped the trust achieve a 15% increase in respiratory patient throughput, a reduction in length of stay from 10.5 to 9.7 days and a 30% increase in referrals to community beds.

Medworxx is one of two companies in the UK offering embedded solutions for utilisation review, the other being the Oak Group. They have both adapted their criteria to comply with NICE guidance.

The company made an agreement with Ernst & Young in April 2015 to jointly exploit the introduction of the NHS England CQUIN 2015/2016 schedules which incentivise patient flow improvement.

Implementing a Medworxx solution is part of the Service Transformation Programme of Guildford and Waverley Clinical Commissioning Group for 2015/6.

== France ==
The Groupe hospitalier Paris Saint-Joseph in the south of Paris agreed to use the Medworxx Clinical Criteria module for 410 medical and surgical beds in January 2015.

== Australia ==
The company stuck a deal with Aspen Medical in June 2015. They have already worked together on patient flow diagnostic audits, known as Patient Throughput Reviews.

== Document management ==
The company also produces a Compliance and Education Solution which supports The Joint Commission regulatory guidelines.
