= Cynthia Pine =

British Dentistry educator (born 1953)

Cynthia Margaret Pine
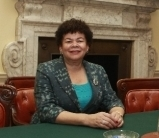
- Cynthia Pine in 2009
- Born: October 1953 (age 72)
- Education: University of Manchester, Bachelor of Dental Surgery, 1976 University of Manchester, PhD, 1982 University of Dundee, MBA

Cynthia Pine CBE (born October 1953) is a British dentistry educator at the London School of Dentistry. In 2003, she became the first woman appointed to head a dentistry school in the UK.

Pine is part of the group of highly successful Guyanese people in Britain (Michael White of The Guardian refers to them as the "Guyanese mafia"), which includes Waheed Alli, Raj Persaud, Herman Ouseley and David Dabydeen, Keith Waithe and Rudolph Dunbar.

== Life ==
Pine was born in 1953 in Guyana. She graduated from the University of Manchester with a Bachelor of Dental Surgery (BDS) in 1976 and a PhD from the same institution in 1982, and has an MBA from the University of Dundee.

She was appointed dean of the University of Liverpool School of Dentistry in 2003. She was later appointed as pro vice chancellor, international at Salford University.

Pine was made a Commander of the Most Excellent Order of the British Empire (CBE) in 2006. She has been included in the Powerlist of the UK's 100 most influential people of African and Afro-Caribbean descent.

Since 2013 Pine has been a professor of dental public health at the Institute of Dentistry, Barts and The London School of Medicine and Dentistry, and academic lead and head of the Unit of Dental Public Health since 2014.

In 2018, Pine was awarded the EW Borrow Memorial Award at the International Association for Dental Research Conference in London, in recognition of her research in oral health prevention for children.

In 2020 a portrait of Pine was included in the exhibition Phenomenal Women: Portraits of UK Black Female Professors.

== Family and early life ==
Pine's father was from British Guiana but was studying in the U.S. in 1941 and came to Britain as a G.I. during the Second World War. While in Britain, he met Pine's mother and they wed after the war. Inter-relationships were discouraged during this time as racial mixing was seen as a threat to the British national identity. As a result, Pine's father experienced racism in Britain and struggled to find work, meaning it was difficult for the family to find somewhere to live. Eventually, they settled in Birmingham, but as the only Black child in the school, Cynthia was also subjected to racism.
