= Royal Southern Hospital =

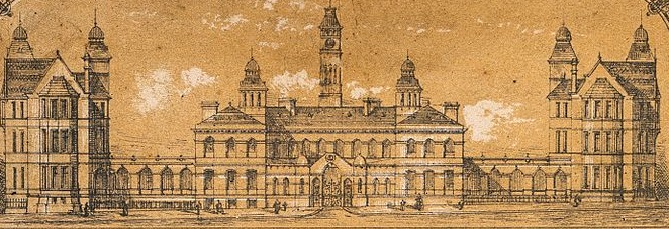
- Tinted lithograph showing the hospital

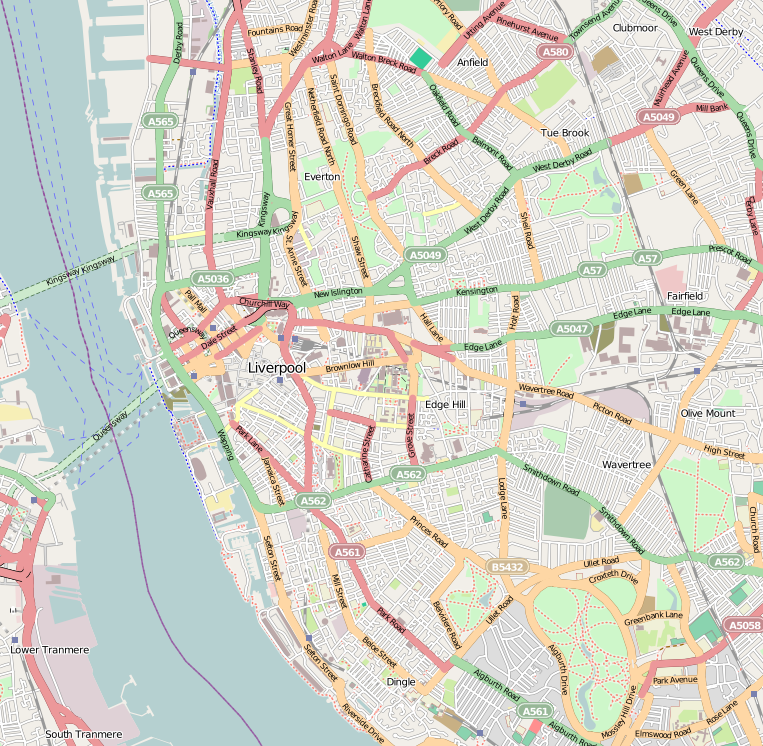
- Location in Liverpool Location in Merseyside

Geography
- Location: Caryl Street, Liverpool, England
- Coordinates: 53.3913°N 2.9797°W

Organisation
- Care system: Public NHS

History
- Founded: 1842
- Closed: 1978

Links
- Lists: Hospitals in England

The Royal Southern Hospital was located in Caryl Street, Liverpool. It was established in 1842 and closed in 1978.

== History ==
The hospital had its origins in the Southern and Toxteth Hospital in Greenland Street which opened in January 1842. A concert given by Jenny Lind allowed an extra floor to be added to the building in the 1850s, shortly before it became the Southern Hospital in 1857.

The foundation stone for a new purpose-built facility on Caryl Street was laid by the Earl of Derby in October 1867 and the new facility was formally opened by the Duke of Connaught as the Royal Southern Hospital in May 1872. It joined the National Health Service in 1948. After services transferred to the Royal Liverpool Hospital, the Royal Southern Hospital closed in 1978.
