= Springfield Park, Liverpool =

Public park in Liverpool, England

Springfield Park
- Interactive map of Springfield Park
- Type: Public Park
- Location: Liverpool, England, UK
- Coordinates: 53.4182°N 2.8981°W
- Area: 22 acres (89,000 m^{2})
- Created: 1907
- Operator: Liverpool City Council see also Friends of Springfield Park
- Status: Open all year

Springfield Park is a 22-acre (8.9 ha) park in Liverpool, England.

It is located in the suburb of Knotty Ash, and lies to the north of Prescot Road. Much of the park is now occupied by the newly rebuilt Alder Hey Children's Hospital, which opened in October 2015. The park has a direct track that links to the Trans Pennine Trail. It also has a path that leads into Alder Veterinary Hospital's Car-park and then continues to Eaton Road.

== History ==
Springfield was originally the estate and grounds of Springfield House, one of a number of wealthy properties on the outskirts of the city. After a succession of owners, the estate was acquired in 1907 by Liverpool City corporation as a public amenity. The house, which stood in the north-west corner of the park, and the lodge at the front entrance, are no longer standing.

== Features ==
The park has a number of features, but consists mainly of green space. There is an area that is situated next to the nearby Alder Hey Children's Alder Hey Children's Hospital that mainly consists of flower Flower beds and has a lambanana . It also has a children's playground on the site of the house, though no trace of the house remains.

The park also contains an obelisk commemorating the death of Lord Nelson, which stands inside the main entrance. It was made on the orders of a Mr Downward, a sugar merchant of the city, who owned Springfield House at the time. It was offered to the city as a bequest, but the city council rejected it as being too small (one councillor dismissing it as "a half-nelson"). Insulted by this, Downward had the obelisk erected in the grounds of his home, where it remains. The obelisk is 40 ft (12 m) high, of red sandstone blocks, and bore a brass plaque with an inscription to the memory of Lord Nelson. It was Grade II Listed in June 1985.

== Alder Hey in the Park ==
In 2012 proposals to rebuild Alder Hey Children's Hospital were announced and the construction of the new hospital broke ground in the Springfield Park in January 2013, taking a total of two years to build. The new hospital opened in October 2015 and plans include demolishing the original Alder Hey buildings then transforming the old hospital site by be reclaiming the land as new park space for the surrounding community.
