= Liverpool Heart and Chest Hospital NHS Foundation Trust =

Hospital in Liverpool, England

Coordinates: 53.4105°N 2.9014°W

- Type: NHS hospital trust
- Established: April 2006
- Disbanded: October 2014
- Headquarters: Broadgreen, Liverpool, England
- Budget: £103,971 2013/14
- Hospitals: Liverpool Heart and Chest Hospital
- Chair: Val Davies
- Chief executive: Liz Bishop
- Website: Heart and Chest Hospital

Liverpool Heart and Chest Hospital NHS Foundation Trust is an NHS foundation trust located in the suburb of Broadgreen within the city of Liverpool, England. It manages the Liverpool Heart and Chest Hospital which serves the population of Merseyside, North West England, North Wales and the Isle of Man but also provides some specialist services for patients from all areas of the United Kingdom performing up to 12,000 procedures a year.

== Performance ==
It was named by the Health Service Journal as one of the top hundred NHS trusts to work for in 2015. At that time it had 1335 full-time equivalent staff and a sickness absence rate of 4.13%. 92% of staff recommend it as a place for treatment and 69% recommended it as a place to work.

The Care Quality Commission awarded LHCH an 'Outstanding' rating following their inspection in summer 2016. 2019 saw Liverpool Heart and Chest Hospital become one of only five NHS service providers to receive the 'Outstanding' rating twice, resulting from a CQC inspection in February 2019.

== See also ==
- List of hospitals in England
- List of NHS trusts
