= Liverpool Women's Hospital =

- Liverpool Women's NHS Foundation Trust and NHS University Hospitals of Liverpool Group
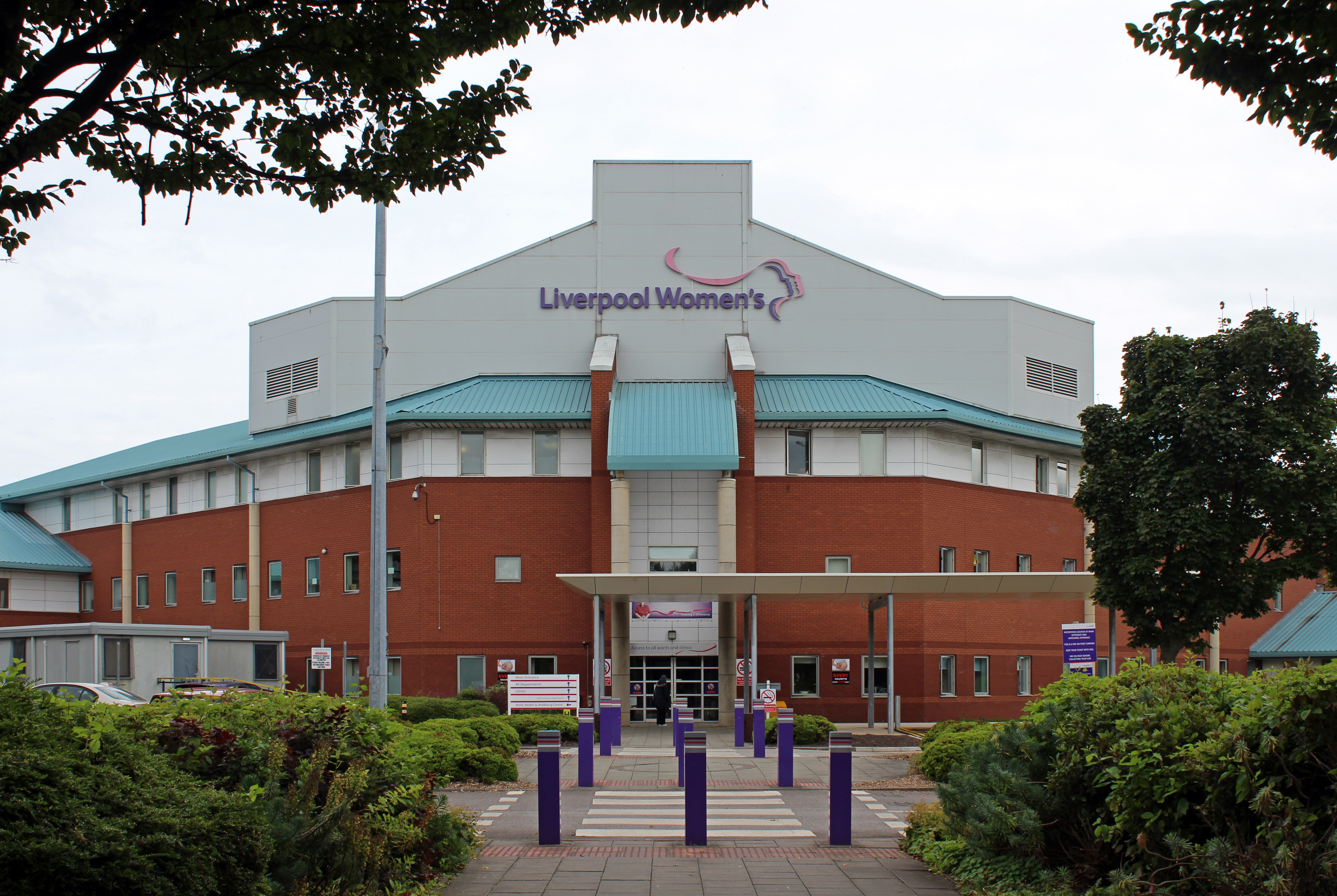

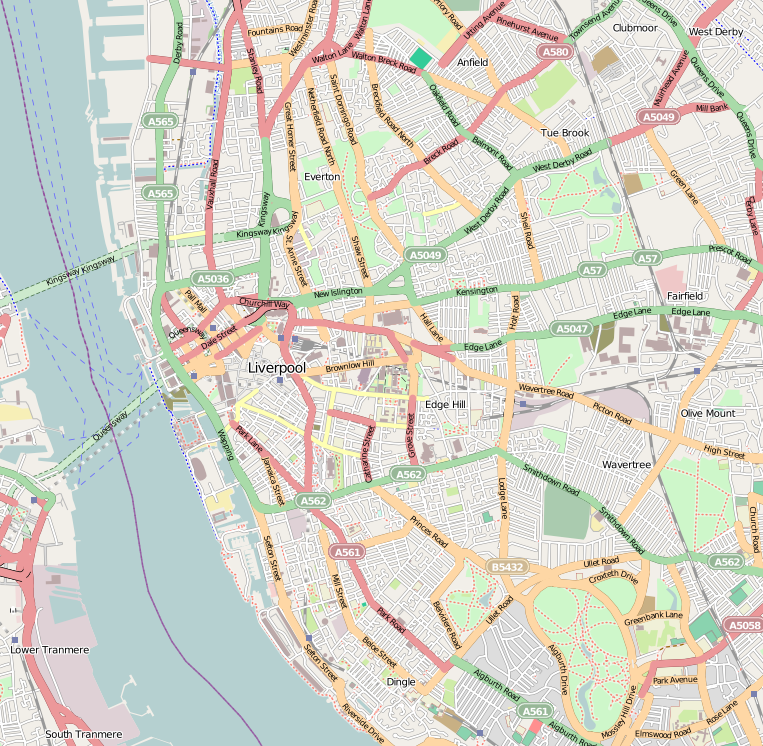
- Location in Liverpool Location in Merseyside

Geography
- Location: Crown Street, Liverpool, L8 7SS
- Coordinates: 53.39845°N 2.96098°W

Organisation
- Care system: Public NHS
- Type: Specialist
- Affiliated university: University of Liverpool, Liverpool John Moores University

Services
- Emergency department: Obstetric emergencies only
- Speciality: Obstetrics, gynaecology, neonatology

History
- Founded: 1994

Links
- Website: www.liverpoolwomens.nhs.uk

Liverpool Women's Hospital is a major obstetrics, gynaecology and neonatology research hospital in Liverpool, England.

It is one of several specialist hospitals located within the Liverpool City Region, alongside Alder Hey Children's Hospital, Liverpool Heart and Chest Hospital, the Walton Centre, Mersey Regional Burns and Plastic Surgery Unit and Clatterbridge Cancer Centre.

It became part of NHS University Hospitals of Liverpool Group on 1 November 2024.

The hospital receives approximately 50,000 patients annually and is the largest hospital for its specialism in Europe.

== History ==
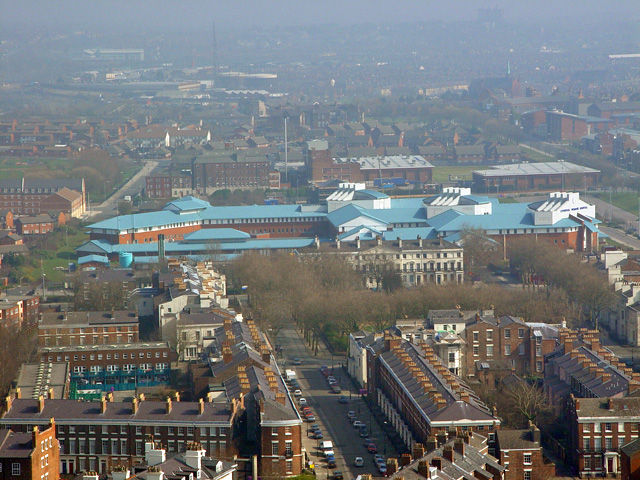
Liverpool Women's Hospital from the roof of Liverpool Cathedral

Approval to build the new hospital was granted by the Secretary of State for Health William Waldegrave MP in September 1991. However, objections raised around November 1991 meant that the project was put on hold, with concerns around how many beds the new hospital would contain and the cost of the scheme. Construction eventually started in September 1992, on a 13 acres (5.3 ha) site near Upper Parliament Street.

The hospital, which replaced the Women's Hospital in Catharine Street, the Liverpool Maternity Hospital, and Mill Road Maternity Hospital (formerly Mill Road Infirmary) in a single new building in Crown Street, was designed by the Percy Thomas Partnership and was constructed in red brick with white cladding and light blue metal roofs. It was officially opened by Diana, Princess of Wales in November 1995, although had started accepting patients from February 1995. Built at a cost of around £30 million, the hospital opened with 230 beds. The main corridors take their names from the streets where the former hospitals once stood. A sculpture entitled Mother and Child was erected outside the main entrance to the hospital in 1999 by Terry McDonald.

Liverpool Women's Hospital was investigated in 2018 as part of the investigation into the Countess of Chester Hospital baby murders, as perpetrator Lucy Letby had previously worked there. Following Letby's conviction in 2023, the police announced they would be investigating her activity at Liverpool Women's hospital as part of an overall investigation into Letby's entire career.

=== 2021 attack ===
On 14 November 2021, police were called at approximately 11:00 a.m. UTC following reports of a car explosion. The building went into lockdown and was cordoned off by the police; a man died and another was injured. Counter-terrorism police lead the investigation. The dead man was the passenger in the taxi and that the injured man was the driver.

== Hospitals merged into Liverpool Women's Hospital ==
- Mill Road Hospital was erected by the West Derby Union Board of Guardians as a workhouse infirmary to care for the sick poor. It was re-named Mill Road Infirmary by 1891, and a new nurses home was built. It stayed as a general hospital until after the Second World War when it became a maternity hospital called Mill Road Maternity Hospital. This largely closed in 1993, and in 1995 it was one of the hospitals which merged to form Liverpool Women's Hospital.

=== Notable staff ===
Senior nursing staff of Mill Road infirmary included three women who had trained at The London Hospital under Matron Eva Luckes.

- Edith Walker (1856–1929), Matron 1892 to 1896. She trained at The London between 1881 and 1883, and was Matron's Office assistant from 1883 to 1892.
- Helen Cooper, Night Superintendent from 1892 to 1899. Cooper trained at The London between 1883 and 1885.
- Mary Gertrude Halkett (1863–1935), Assistant Matron 1892 until about 1901. Halkett trained at The London between 1889 and 1891.

== See also ==
- List of hospitals in England
