= Liverpool University Hospitals NHS Foundation Trust =

Healthcare trust in England

- Established: 1 October 2019
- Hospitals: Aintree University Hospital; Broadgreen Hospital; Liverpool University Dental Hospital; Royal Liverpool University Hospital
- Website: www.uhliverpool.nhs.uk

Liverpool University Hospitals NHS Foundation Trust is part of NHS University Hospitals of Liverpool Group. It is responsible for managing Aintree University Hospital, Broadgreen Hospital, Liverpool University Dental Hospital and the Royal Liverpool University Hospital.

== History ==
The Trust was created on 1 October 2019 when the Royal Liverpool and Broadgreen University Hospitals NHS Trust and Aintree University Hospitals NHS Foundation Trust merged.

The organisation joined NHS University Hospitals of Liverpool Group on 1 November 2024.

== Services ==
The Trust delivers a range of services including general hospital services, specialist services, cancer services, dental services and community services. At the time of merger it was reported that there is no plan or desire to close either hospital's emergency department.

In the first quarter of 2026/27 the trust was ranked 8th from the bottom of the acute trust league tables.

== Honorary Freedom of the Borough ==
On 26 January 2023, the Liverpool University Hospitals NHS Foundation Trust was granted the Honorary Freedom of the Metropolitan Borough of Sefton.
