= Alder Hey Children's Hospital =

Children's hospital and NHS Foundation trust in West Derby, Liverpool, England

- Alder Hey Children's NHS Foundation Trust

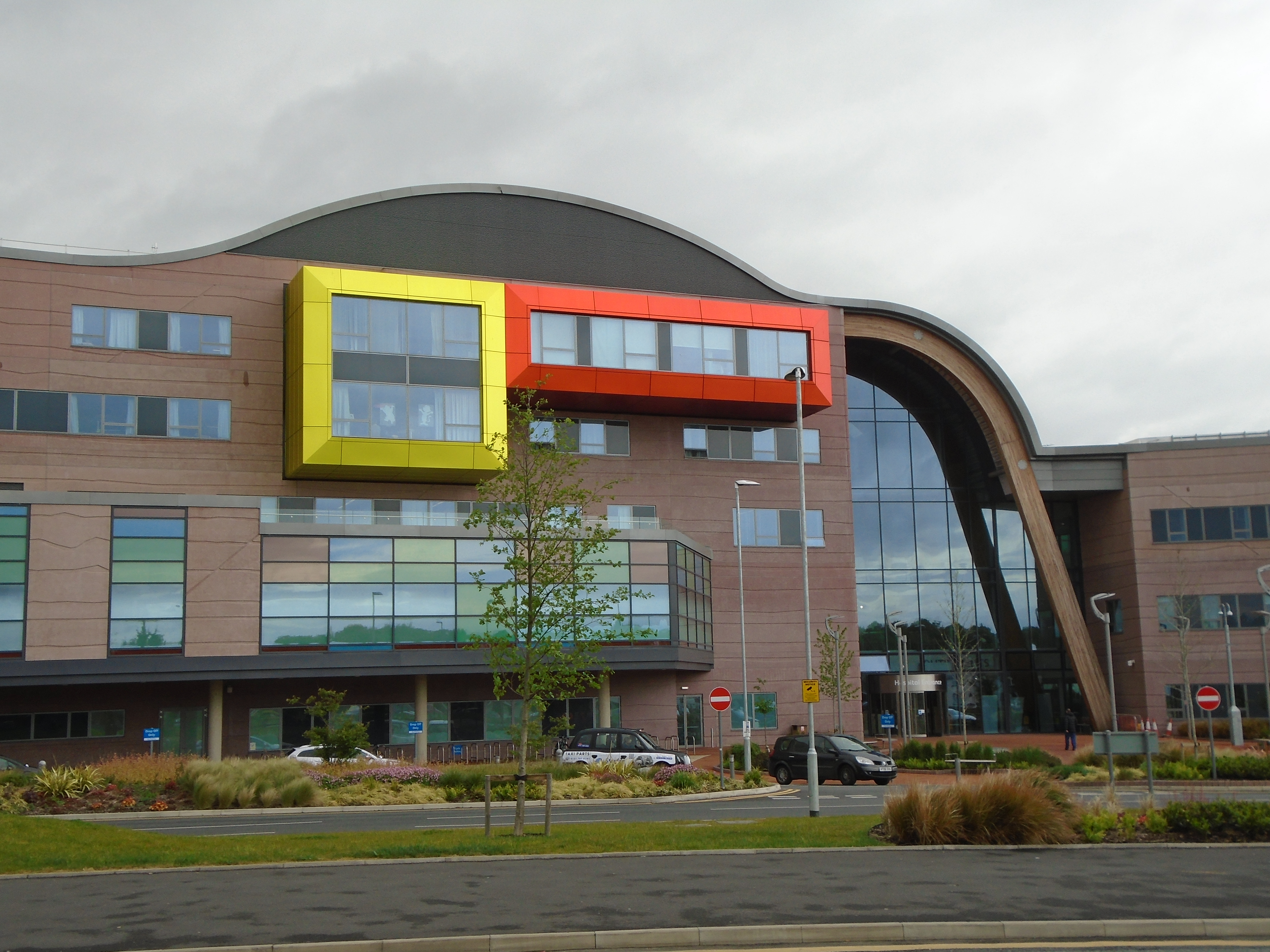
- The main entrance to the new hospital on East Prescot Road

- Location in Merseyside

Geography
- Location: Liverpool, England
- Coordinates: 53.42053°N 2.89677°W

Organisation
- Care system: NHS
- Type: Specialist
- Affiliated university: University of Liverpool; Liverpool John Moores University

Services
- Emergency department: Yes – Major Trauma Centre
- Beds: 309
- Speciality: Children's hospital

History
- Founded: 1914; 112 years ago

Links
- Website: www.alderhey.nhs.uk, www.alderheycharity.org

Alder Hey Children's Hospital is a children's hospital and NHS foundation trust in West Derby, Liverpool, England. It is one of the largest children's hospitals in the United Kingdom, and one of several specialist hospitals within the Liverpool City Region, alongside the Royal Liverpool University Hospital, Liverpool Women's Hospital, Liverpool Heart and Chest Hospital, the Walton Centre, Mersey Regional Burns and Plastic Surgery Unit, and Clatterbridge Cancer Centre.

== History ==
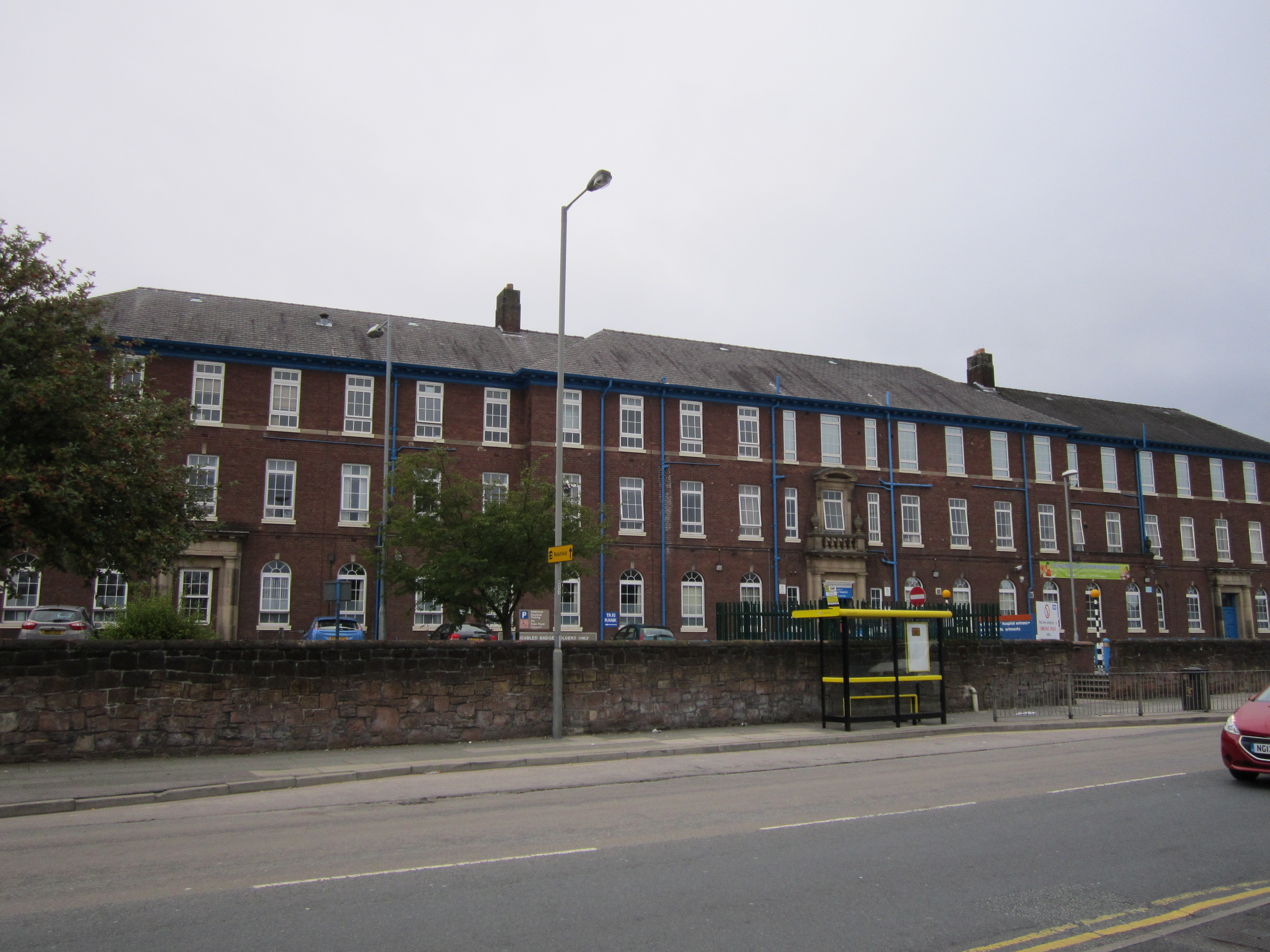
A view of the old hospital on Eaton Road

=== Early history ===
The site was previously occupied by a mansion known as Alder Hey which the local poor law guardians acquired for use as a children's home in 1910. The mansion was converted for use as a military hospital in 1914. During the First World War, the United States Army established Camp Hospital 40 on the site, operated by Hospital Unit Q and, subsequently, Unit W. American sources commonly refer to Alder Hey as being within Liverpool's Knotty Ash area.

During the Second World War, parts of the hospital were again used to treat injured military personnel. The Liverpool Neonatal Surgical Unit opened at the hospital in 1953. This unit was the first neonatal intensive care unit in the United Kingdom. The opening was largely due to the efforts of Isabella Forshall, a paediatric surgeon.

In 1990 when Myrtle Street Children's Hospital (founded in 1869 and previously known as Royal Liverpool Children's Hospital) closed, Alder Hey absorbed its A&E department. The hospital authority was one of 57 such bodies which became an NHS hospital trust in 1991. Ronald McDonald House, a home for the families of sick children, opened in 1993.

In 1999 an inquiry was instituted into the Alder Hey organs scandal and to investigate the hospital's practices in respect of removal and retention of human tissue. The inquiry had far-reaching effects throughout the UK hospital system and provided the impetus for the Human Tissue Act 2004.

In August 2008 the Royal Liverpool Children's NHS Trust became an NHS foundation trust and changed its name to Alder Hey NHS Foundation Trust. Between 2010 and 2014 the number of doctors employed at the trust increased from 269 to 344, while the number of managers increased from 70 to 86. At the end of March 2017, the trust was confirmed as one of four additional NHS Global Digital Exemplars, joining the twelve announced in September 2016.

=== Redevelopment ===
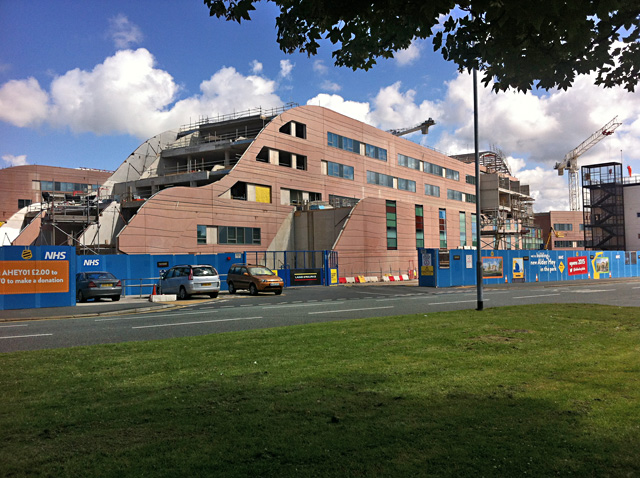
The new hospital under construction

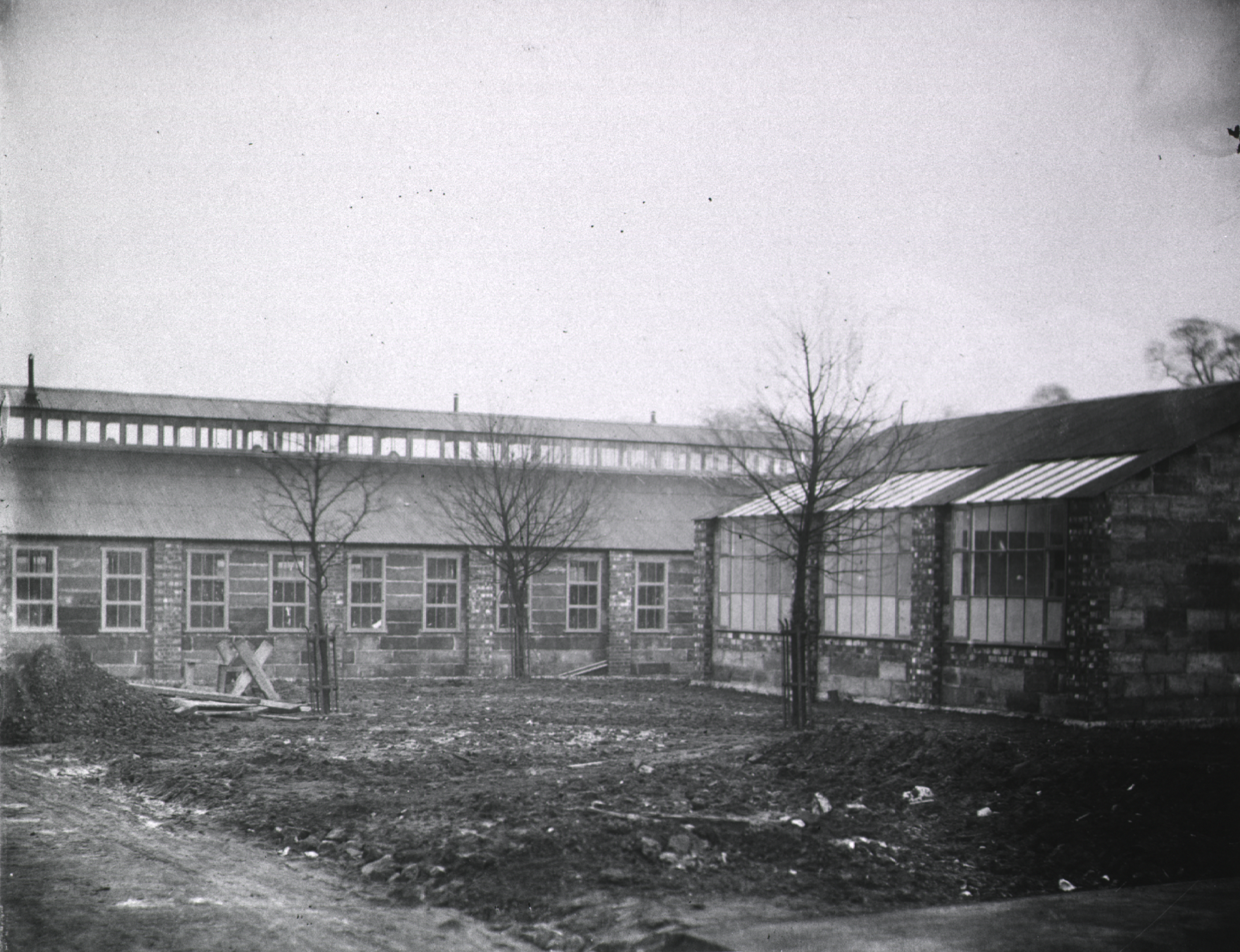
Side view of the US Army camp hospital in 1919 showing operating room on the right

Alder Hey had its centenary year in 2014, the last year in which it operated from the buildings on its original site. A new hospital was procured under Private Finance Initiative contract in neighbouring Springfield Park. The works, which were carried out by Laing O'Rourke at a cost of £187 million, began on 26 March 2013 and the hospital opened in October 2015. It was Europe's first children's hospital built in a park. The original Alder Hey buildings were mostly demolished and the land was reclaimed as new parkland for the surrounding community.

Features of the new hospital include access to play areas, natural light and striking views of the park are available wherever possible. Children and young people were involved with the design of the new hospital. A drawing of a flower by teenage patient Eleanor Brogan impressed architects and inspired their final design.

== Facilities ==
The hospital is a centre of excellence for oncology and muscular dystrophy as well as spinal, heart and brain conditions. It was also the first UK Centre of Excellence for Childhood Lupus and is:

- A Department of Health Centre for Head and Face Surgery
- One of four national centres for childhood epilepsy surgery, a joint service with the Royal Manchester Children's Hospital
- A designated Children's Major Trauma Centre

Alder Hey has Europe's first 3T Intraoperative MRI scanner which is a pioneering technology for neurosurgery, providing surgeons with extremely high resolution images and reducing the need for repeat operations in 90% of cases. It currently employs about 2,400 staff and treats over 270,000 children from across the UK each year.

== Research and development ==
Alder Hey conducts paediatric research into children's medicines, infection, inflammation and oncology. It has research partners including the University of Liverpool and is a member of Liverpool Health Partners. Alder Hey conducts more than 100 clinical research studies on an ongoing basis, ranging from observation to clinical trials. The hospital is within the National Institute for Health and Care Research's Top 100 Performing Trust's for participation recruitment in 2013/14. Alder Hey was a finalist in the Clinical Research Impact category of the 2013 HSJ Awards and in 2014 the innovation team received the Health Service Journal Award for improving health care with technology.

In 2016 the first phase of a bespoke research, education and innovation centre, Institute in the Park, opened next to Alder Hey in the Park. In November 2015, the institute hosted a children's health Hackathon in conjunction with Massachusetts Institute of Technology.

=== Notable firsts ===
Alder Hey was the first hospital to:

- Test penicillin on a child, saving the child from pneumonia in 1944
- Establish a neonatal unit in the UK
- Pioneer various splints and appliances, including the Thomas splint
- Introduce 'liquid glass' to reduce infection
- Be accredited by the World Health Organization for public health promotion (first paediatric hospital)

== Charitable work ==
=== Alder Hey Children's Charity ===
Alder Hey Children's Charity supports the work of the hospital. In addition to NHS funding which covers the running costs of the hospital, Alder Hey relies on charitable support. Funds are spent directly on initiatives in the hospital to benefit patients. It funds research initiatives, patient and family enhancements and state of the art medical equipment. Known as the 'Imagine Appeal' until 2012, Alder Hey Children's Charity is based within the hospital. On 14 October 2013 the charity launched a public appeal to raise £30m to fund equipment, facilities and research at Alder Hey's new hospital, Alder Hey in the Park. In October 2015 the charity announced over £20m had been raised.

Alder Hey has numerous notable supporters, including Yoko Ono as Honorary Patron, Steven Gerrard as Appeal Founding Partner and Patrons including:

- Wayne Rooney
- Coleen Rooney
- AP McCoy
- Mick Fitzgerald
- Beth Tweddle
- Jamie Carragher
- David Morrissey
- Andrew Flintoff
- Leighton Baines

In 2009 charitable support allowed Alder Hey to buy Europe's first 3T intraoperative MRI scanner. In one charitably funded project, the sound recordist and musician Chris Watson was employed to devise an art project, using bird song recordings made by children to calm other young patients as they received injections and other treatments.

=== Art For Their Sake ===
In 1978, the charity Art For Their Sake, a team of volunteer artists led by founder George Nicholas (now of Ormskirk, England), produced the world's longest mural in the corridors of Alder Hey Children's Hospital. A Guinness Record was set with a total of 17,963 square feet of murals, and awarded to the hospital in 1986. Nicholas and his team continued to work on these murals for a period of 30 years, adding to as well as restoring and maintaining, for a total of over 34,000 square feet.

=== Arts for Health ===
Alder Hey runs an Arts for Health programme, funded entirely through charitable sources including Alder Hey Children's Charity. The programme aims to enhance the experience of being a patient and includes animation projects, music and dance therapy, creative writing, comedy workshops and storytelling.

=== International Child Health Development Programme ===
An international child health development programme led by Alder Hey clinicians focuses on humanitarian work in developing countries. The programme includes provision of immediate medical support, knowledge sharing and involvement with international clinical trials. The programme has undertaken work across Africa and Asia, including Pakistan, Malawi, Nepal and India.

== TV appearances ==
During the 1990s, Alder Hey was featured in the BBC television series Children's Hospital.

In 2011, chef Heston Blumenthal took to the challenge of changing the dinner menu of Alder Hey Children's Hospital on his televised show, Heston's Mission Impossible.

Since September 2012, Alder Hey has regularly featured on the CBBC television series Operation Ouch!.

== Performance ==
In October 2013, the Care Quality Commission's Intelligent Monitoring system placed Alder Hey in category one, meaning it would be amongst the first hospitals to be inspected under a new style of inspection.

In May 2014, Alder Hey was inspected by the Care Quality Commission and was given the overall rating Requires Improvement.

In June 2015, Alder Hey was re-inspected by the Care Quality Commission and was given the overall rating Good, and was rated Outstanding in the Caring category.

Another inspection took place in 2018, the overall rating was unchanged.

== Management ==
Dame Josephine Williams was appointed Chair of the Trust Board in February 2019. Louise Shepherd CBE was appointed Chief Executive of the trust in March 2008.

== Honorary Freedom of the Borough ==
On 26 January 2023, the Alder Hey Children's Hospital NHS Foundation Trust was granted the Honorary Freedom of the Metropolitan Borough of Sefton.

== See also ==
- List of hospitals in England
- List of NHS trusts
