= Walton sextuplets =

Sextuplets

- Born: Hannah Jane Walton; Lucy Anne Walton; Ruth Michelle Walton; Sarah Louise Walton; Kate Elizabeth Walton; Jennifer Rose Walton; 18 November 1983 (age 42); Liverpool, England
- Known for: First all-female surviving sextuplets; fourth known set of surviving sextuplets
- Parents: Graham Walton (father); Janet Leadbetter (mother)

The Walton sextuplets were born at Liverpool Maternity Hospital in Liverpool, England on the evening of 18 November 1983. They were the world's first all-female surviving sextuplets, the world's fourth known set of surviving sextuplets, and the first surviving sextuplets born in the United Kingdom. The children are Hannah, Lucy, Ruth, Sarah, Kate, and Jennifer.

The children were born to Janet (née Leadbetter) and Graham Walton, who were married in 1976. They grew up in the family's seven-bedroom home in Wallasey, Merseyside. On 13 June 2011 the sextuplets were featured in the ITV1 programme Moving On.

In February 2015, Janet Walton's book Six Little Miracles: The Heartwarming True Story of Raising the World's First Sextuplet Girls was published by Ebury Press.

== Children ==
All six children were delivered by Caesarean section at Liverpool Maternity Hospital, Liverpool at 31 and a half weeks gestation. In order of birth the sextuplets are:

1. Hannah Jane
2. Lucy Anne
3. Ruth Michelle
4. Sarah Louise
5. Kate Elizabeth
6. Jennifer Rose

== See also ==
- List of multiple births
