= Walton Centre =

Neurological hospital in Liverpool, England

- The Walton Centre NHS Foundation Trust
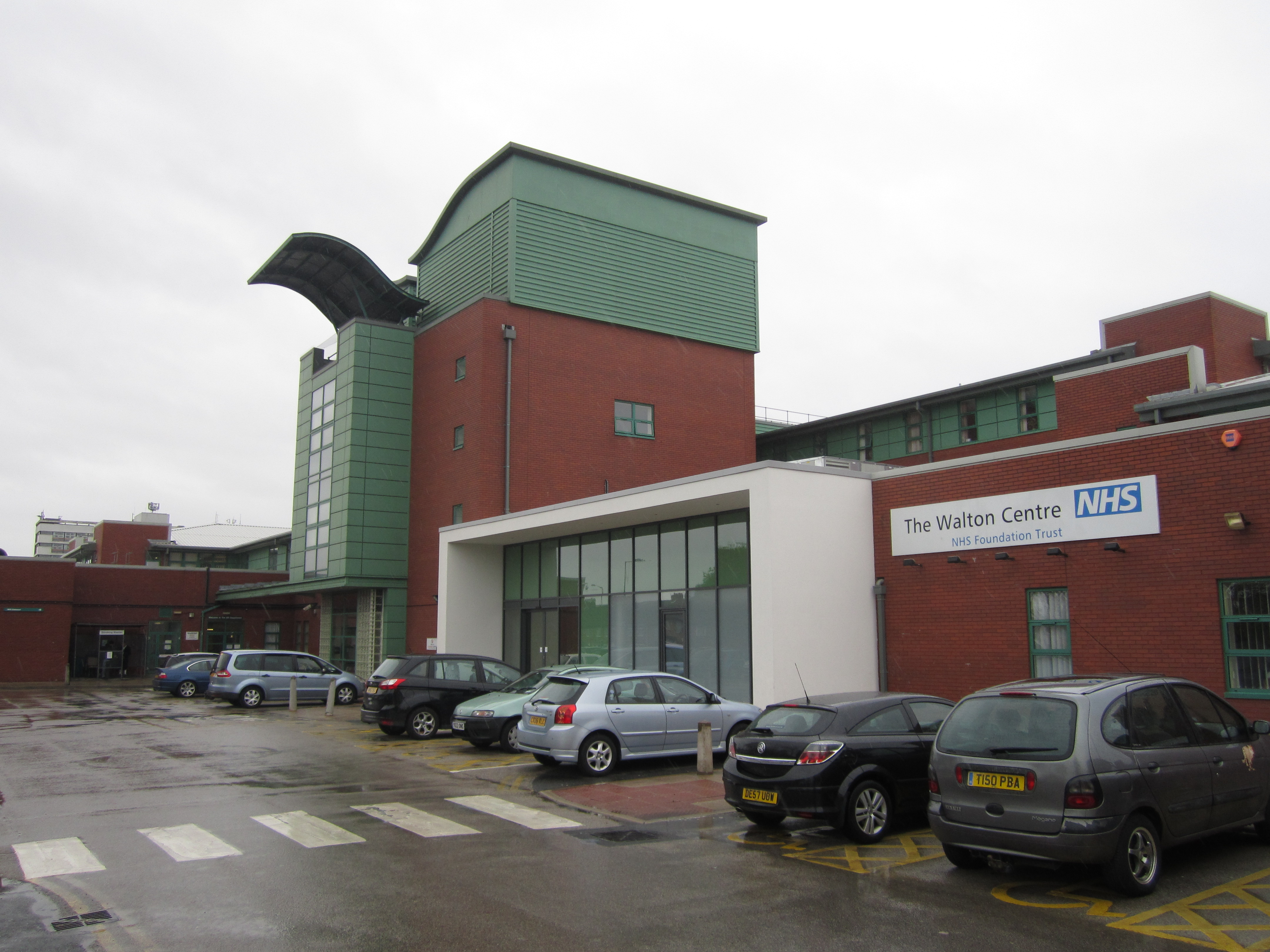
- Main Entrance, Lower Lane

- Location in Merseyside

Geography
- Location: Lower Lane, Fazakerley, Liverpool, L9 7LJ.
- Coordinates: 53.46654°N 2.9310°W

Organisation
- Care system: Public NHS
- Type: Specialist
- Affiliated university: University of Liverpool, Edge Hill University, Liverpool School of Tropical Medicine

Services
- Emergency department: No
- Beds: 157
- Speciality: Neurology and Neurosurgery

History
- Founded: 1941 as the Walton Centre for Neurology at Walton Hospital

Links
- Website: http://www.thewaltoncentre.nhs.uk

The Walton Centre, formally known as the Walton Centre for Neurology and Neurosurgery, is a major neurology hospital located in the suburb of Fazakerley in the city of Liverpool, England. It is one of several specialist hospitals located within the Liverpool City Region alongside Liverpool Heart and Chest Hospital, Alder Hey Children's Hospital, Liverpool Women's Hospital, Mersey Regional Burns and Plastic Surgery Unit and Clatterbridge Cancer Centre. The wards in the hospital are all named after pioneering neurosurgeons in the 20th and 21st century. It is managed by the Walton Centre NHS Foundation Trust.

== History ==
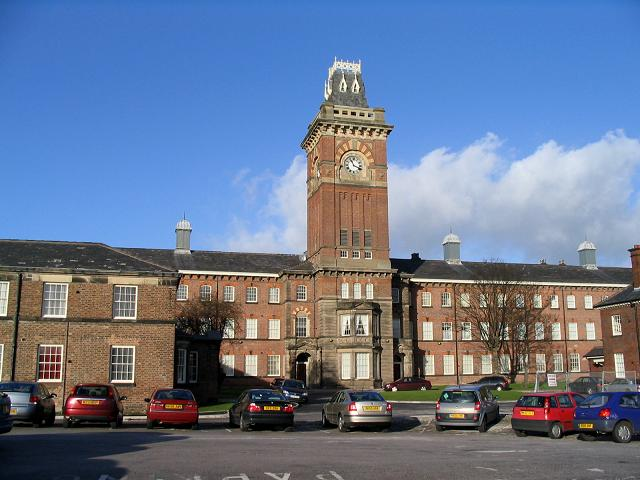
The Walton Centre originated from the Walton Centre for Neurology at Walton Hospital on Rice Lane in Walton, Liverpool.

The Walton Centre originally provided services from the Walton Centre for Neurology at Walton Hospital on Rice Lane in Walton, Liverpool. However, as demand for services continued to increase, the capacity for provision at the relatively small Rice Lane site failed to keep pace and in 1998 all services were transferred to a new, purpose-built complex two miles north in Fazakerley adjacent to and adjoining Aintree University Hospital. The centre achieved NHS Trust status in 1992, and NHS Foundation Trust status in 2009.

In 2014 the Walton Centre became the first hospital in the UK to virtually open its doors to Google Street view to the main clinical areas.

It was announced, on 4 October 2022, that the centre had achieved the status of a university hospital.

On 9 October 2026, the Princess Royal unveiled a plaque renaming the Operating Theatre department in memory of neurosurgeon Diana Beck.

== Services ==
The Walton Centre is a specialist neurosciences NHS trust dedicated to providing comprehensive neurological, neurosurgical, pain management and rehabilitation services. The majority of patients originate from Merseyside, Cheshire, North Wales, Lancashire and the Isle of Man, but for some specialist treatments of complex disorders the centre sees patients from all regions of the United Kingdom, referred by their general practitioner (GP) or other hospitals. The hospital does not have an accident and emergency department. However, alongside adjoining Aintree University Hospital, Walton acts as a designated major trauma centre and receives emergency transfers for those who have sustained neurological trauma in the region.

== Performance ==
In 2006, the hospital was identified as "the most dangerous hospital in Merseyside and Cheshire for health workers".

There were allegations, in February 2007, that a surgeon at the hospital removed brain tissue for research purposes without the patient's consent. The samples were used to test a new treatment for brain diseases on which the surgeon was joint owner of the patent. The hospital has been criticised for not offering treatments available in the United States.

In 2015 it was named by the Health Service Journal as the second best acute specialist trust to work for. At that time it had 1,160 full-time equivalent staff and a sickness absence rate of 4.45%. 88% of staff recommend it as a place for treatment and 77% recommended it as a place to work.

In November 2015 leaders at The Walton Centre NHS Foundation Trust were shortlisted for five separate awards.

The Walton Center became the second specialist hospital in the UK to receive the top rating by the Care Quality Commission in October 2016. It retained the status following a Care Quality Commission inspection in August 2019.

== See also ==
- Aintree University Hospitals NHS Foundation Trust
- List of hospitals in England
- List of NHS trusts
