= Liverpool Heart and Chest Hospital =

- Liverpool Heart and Chest Hospital NHS Foundation Trust and NHS University Hospitals of Liverpool Group
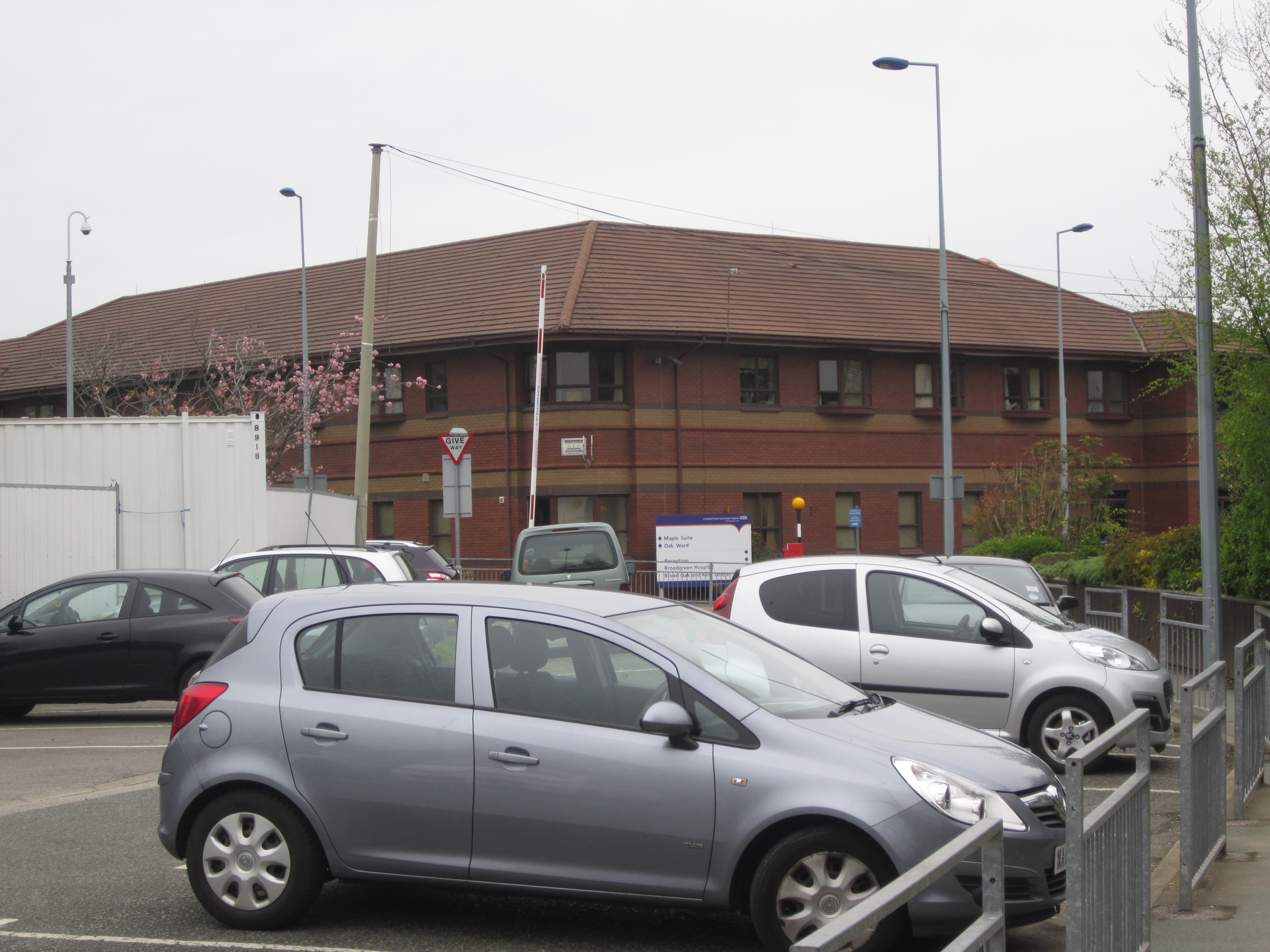
- Liverpool Heart and Chest Hospital

- Location in Merseyside

Geography
- Location: Thomas Drive, Liverpool, L14 3PE
- Coordinates: 53.4106°N 2.9014°W

Organisation
- Care system: Public NHS
- Type: Specialist
- Affiliated university: University of Liverpool, Liverpool John Moores University

Services
- Emergency department: No
- Beds: 187
- Speciality: Cardiothoracic Surgery

History
- Founded: 1991 as The Cardiothoracic Centre, Liverpool; 2008 as Liverpool Heart and Chest Hospital

Links
- Website: www.lhch.nhs.uk

The Liverpool Heart and Chest Hospital is a National Health Service hospital in Liverpool. It is one of several specialist hospitals located within the Liverpool City Region, alongside Liverpool Women's Hospital, Alder Hey Children's Hospital, the Walton Centre, Mersey Regional Burns and Plastic Surgery Unit, and Clatterbridge Cancer Centre. It is managed by the Liverpool Heart and Chest Hospital NHS Foundation Trust.

The hospital is part of NHS University Hospitals of Liverpool Group.

== History ==
The hospital was established as the Cardiothoracic Centre, Liverpool in 1991. Ricky Tomlinson, the actor and comedian, had heart surgery at the hospital in 2007. It became the Liverpool Heart and Chest Hospital at a renaming ceremony led by Sir Ken Dodd in 2008.

In 2016, Liverpool Heart and Chest Hospital became the first specialist hospital within the United Kingdom to be awarded an 'Outstanding' rating by the Care Quality Commission.
