= Liverpool Maternity Hospital =

Liverpool Women's Hospital
- Liverpool Women's NHS Trust
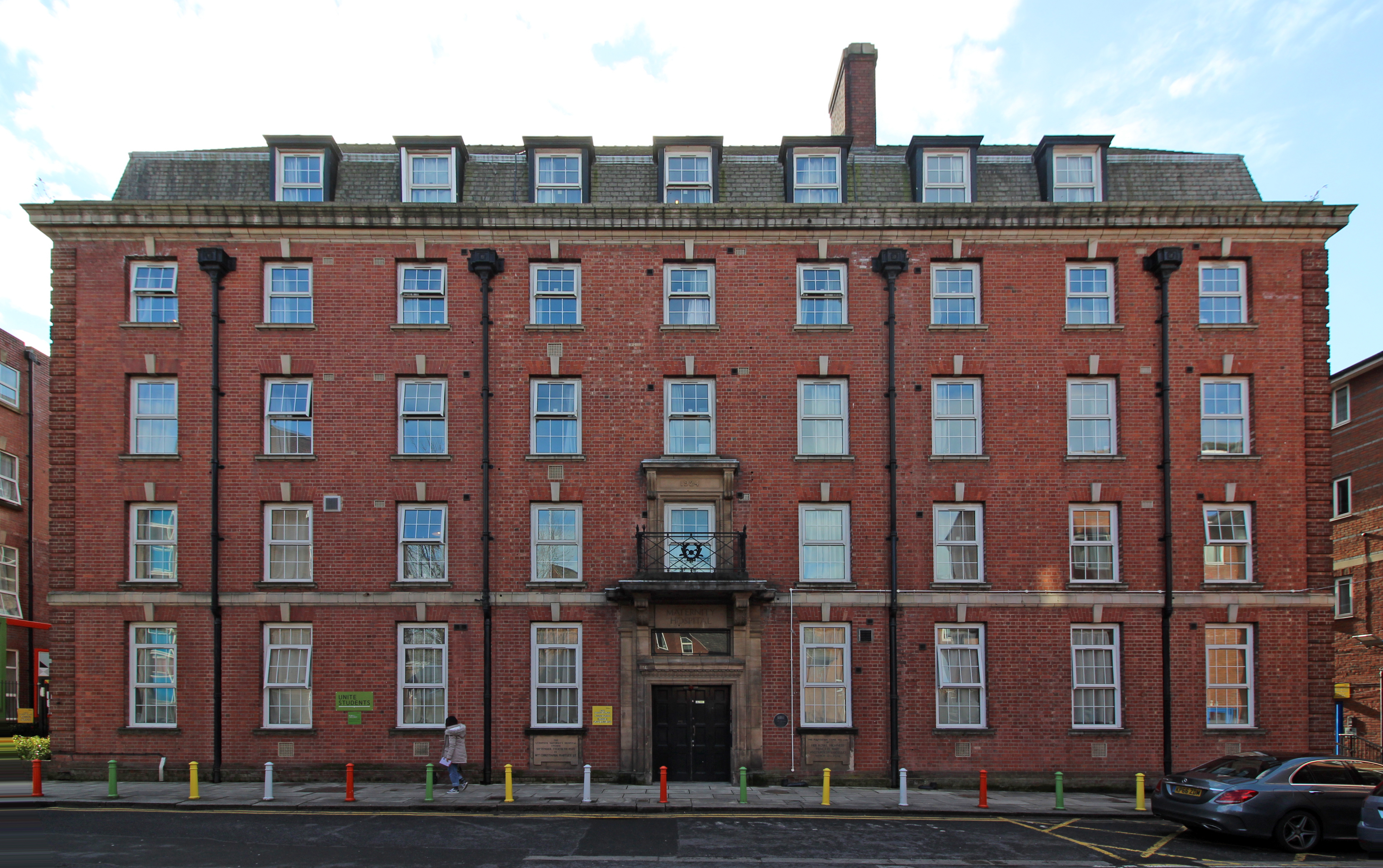
- Former building of the Liverpool Maternity Hospital

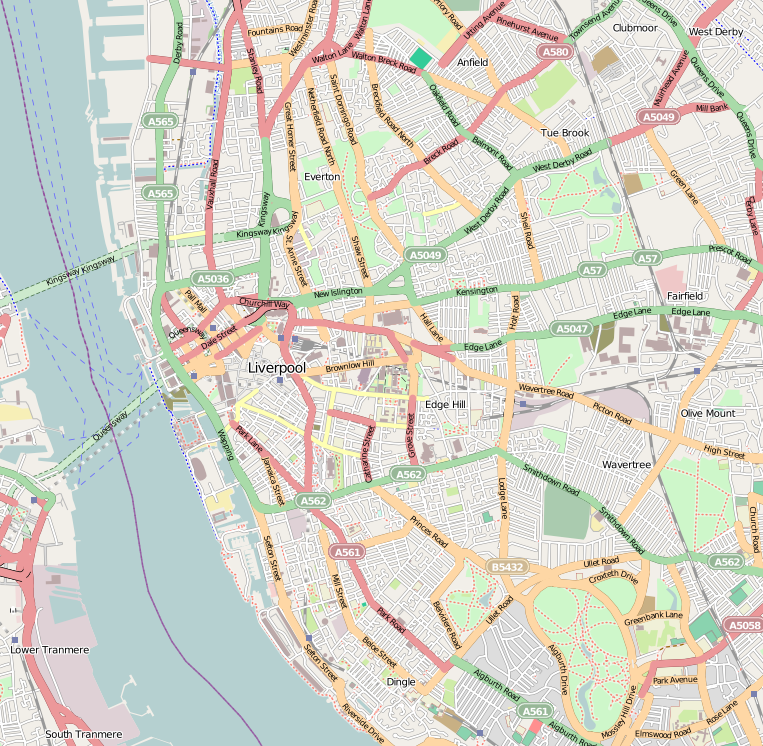
- Location in Liverpool Location in Merseyside

Geography
- Location: Oxford Street Liverpool L7 7BN, England
- Coordinates: 53.4032°N 2.9647°W

Organisation
- Care system: Public NHS
- Type: Specialist
- Affiliated university: University of Liverpool, Liverpool John Moores University

Services
- Emergency department: No
- Speciality: Obstetrics and gynaecology, Neonatology

History
- Founded: November 1841

Links
- Lists: Hospitals in England

The Liverpool Maternity Hospital was established as the Lying-in Hospital and Dispensary for the Diseases of Women and Children in Horatio Street, Scotland Road, Liverpool, in November 1841. It was replaced by the Liverpool Women's Hospital in November 1995.

== History ==
The hospital was established as the Lying-in Hospital and Dispensary for the Diseases of Women and Children in Horatio Street, Scotland Road, Liverpool, in November 1841. It moved to Pembroke Place in 1845 and to Myrtle Street in 1862 and, having become the Ladies Charity and Lying-In Hospital in 1869, it moved to new purpose-built facilities in Brownlow Street in 1885.

A foundation stone for a new facility in Oxford Street was laid by the Princess Mary, Viscountess Lascelles in March 1924 and it was officially opened by Christiana Hartley, the social and welfare rights activist, as the Liverpool Maternity Hospital in September 1926. Famous people born in the hospital included John Lennon who was born there in October 1940. It joined the National Health Service in 1948. The Walton sextuplets were born to Graham and Janet (née Leadbetter) Walton at the hospital in November 1983.

After services transferred to the Liverpool Women's Hospital, the Liverpool Maternity Hospital closed in November 1995 and has since been converted into student accommodation.

== Notable staff ==
Notable staff include:

- Ethel Mary Cauty, OBE (1872–1962) Matron, 1907–1938. During her thirty one year matronship the hospital increased dramatically in size – from 21 beds to 100, with over 2500 deliveries per annum by 1938. She was well regarded by the nursing staff and was renowned for her devotion to the mothers and babies. Cauty trained at The London Hospital, under Matron Eva Luckes. After which she trained as a midwife at York Road Lying in Hospital, London. She was a founder member of the College of Nursing, later the Royal College of Nursing.

== Notable births ==
- Tom Baker, English actor (b. 1934)
- John Lennon, English musician and political activist (b. 1940)
- Janice Long, English broadcaster and disc Jockey (b. 1955)
- Walton sextuplets, a set of sextuplets born on 18 November 1983
- Colin Welland, English actor and screenwriter (b. 1934)
