= University of Liverpool School of Dentistry =

Dental school in Liverpool, England

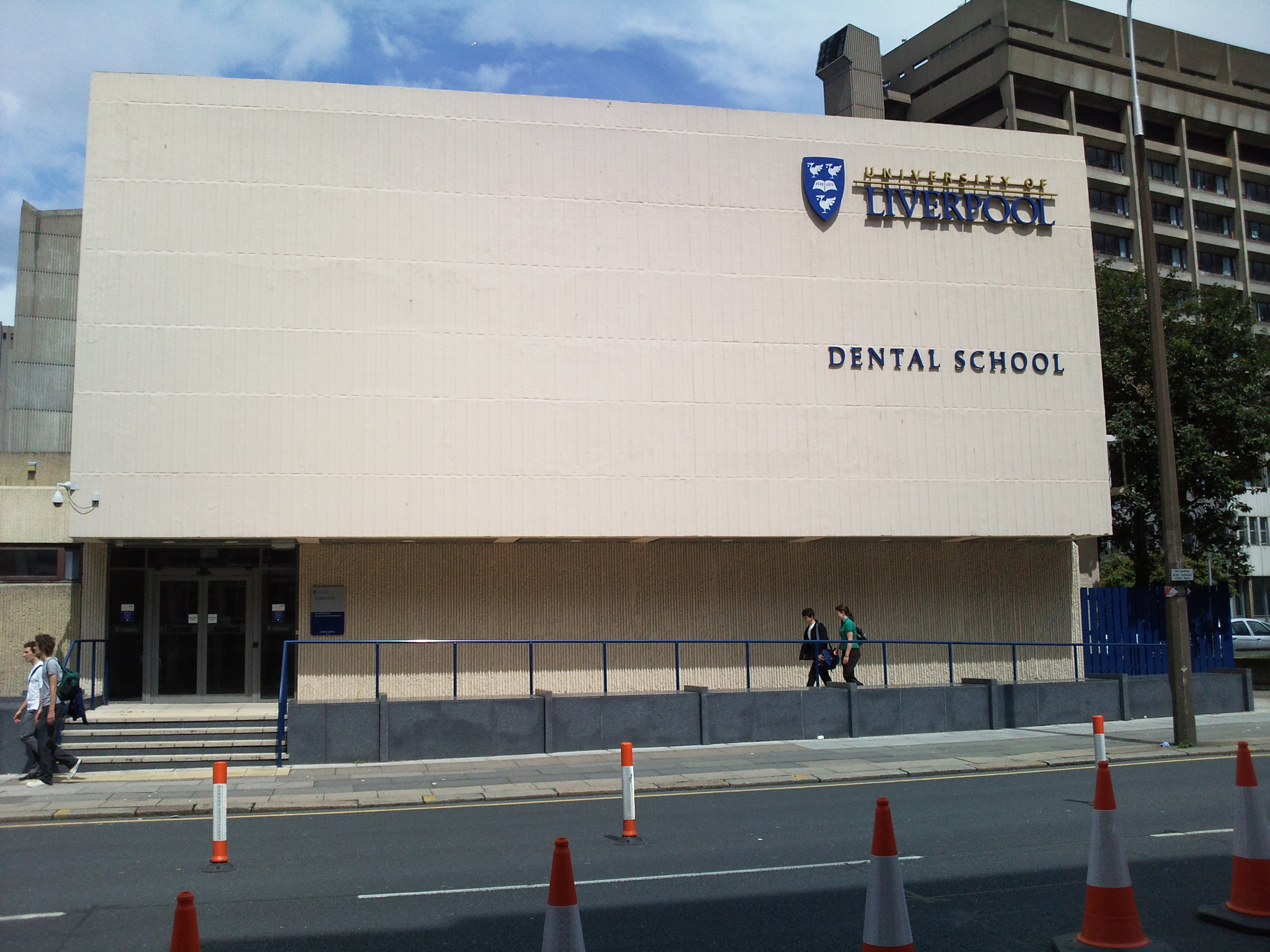
- Main Dental School Building
- Type: Dental school
- Established: 1860
- Parent institution: University of Liverpool
- Dean: Professor Vince Bissell
- Location: Liverpool, Merseyside, England
- Website: www.liverpool.ac.uk/dentistry/

The University of Liverpool School of Dentistry is a dental school in Liverpool, England. It is part of the University of Liverpool. The dental school is attached to an associated hospital, which contains more than 160 dental units, where students train on NHS patients under supervised practice from dentists.

== History ==
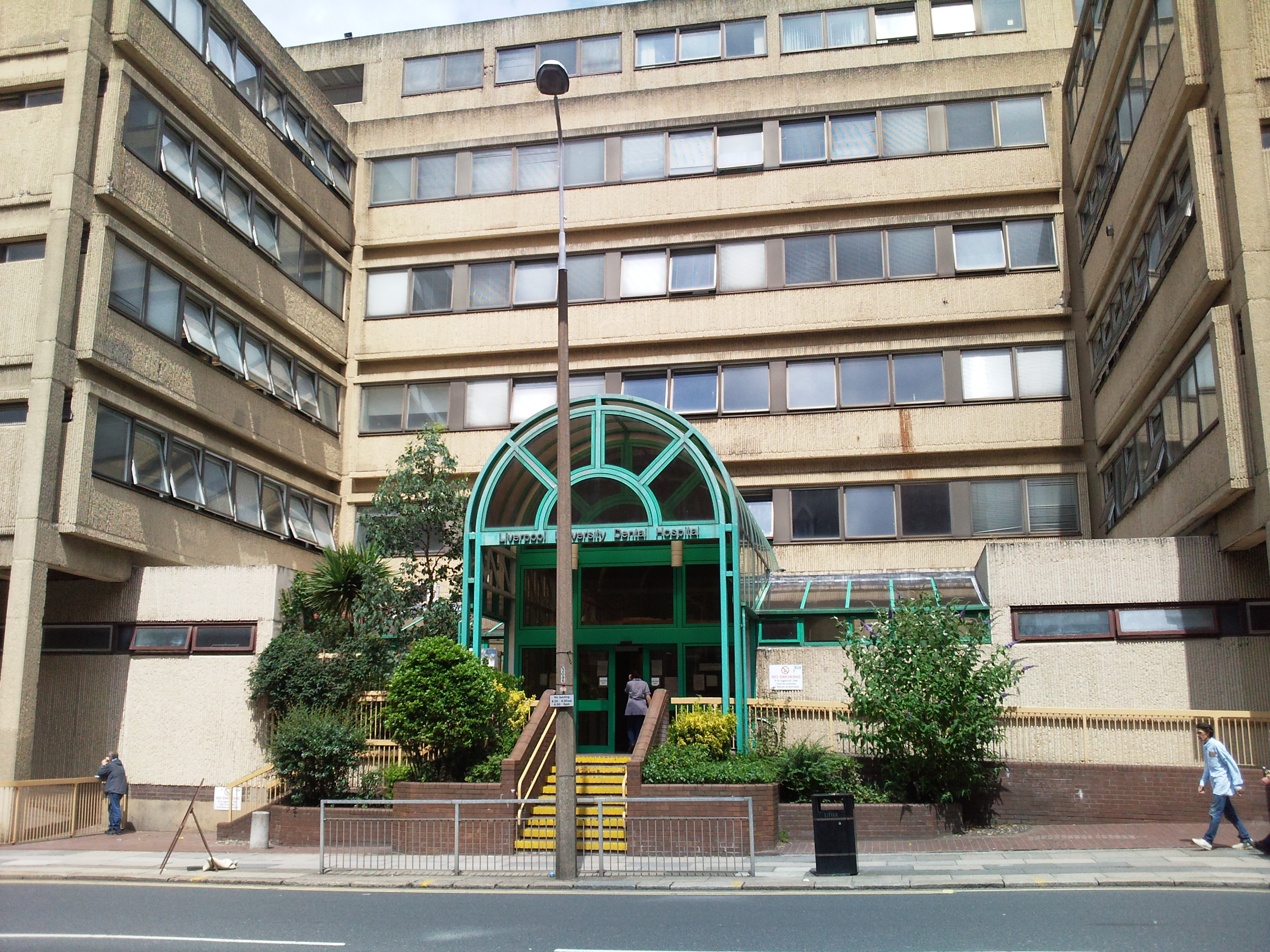
Entrance to Liverpool Dental Hospital

The dental school has its origins in the Liverpool Dispensary for Diseases of the Teeth founded by Captain W J Newman at 82 Russell Street in 1860. It became the Liverpool Dental Hospital in 1863 and moved to 29 Russell Street before moving to 50 Mount Pleasant in 1879 and finally to Pembroke Place in 1910. The Liverpool Dental Hospital merged with Liverpool University Dental School to form the Liverpool University Dental Hospital in 1920. W H Gilmour, the third dean, obtained the first professorship in dentistry in the UK. Other innovations include the first Parodontal (the forerunner of periodontology) Department in 1936 and the first Professor of Dental Sciences (Prof R Hartles) in 1963.

The facility was completely rebuilt in 1969. In 2003 Cynthia Pine became the first woman to lead a British dental school. The hospital currently accommodates approximately 160 dental chairs, within six teaching clinics for Restorative, Paediatric and Prosthetic Dentistry.

== Teaching ==
The Dental School offers a five-year undergraduate course, and a graduate entry four-year pathway, with work being undertaken on an integrated BSc that integrates with the first 3 years of the BDS programme. Liverpool Dental School is a member of the Dental Schools Council.

== Museum of Dentistry ==
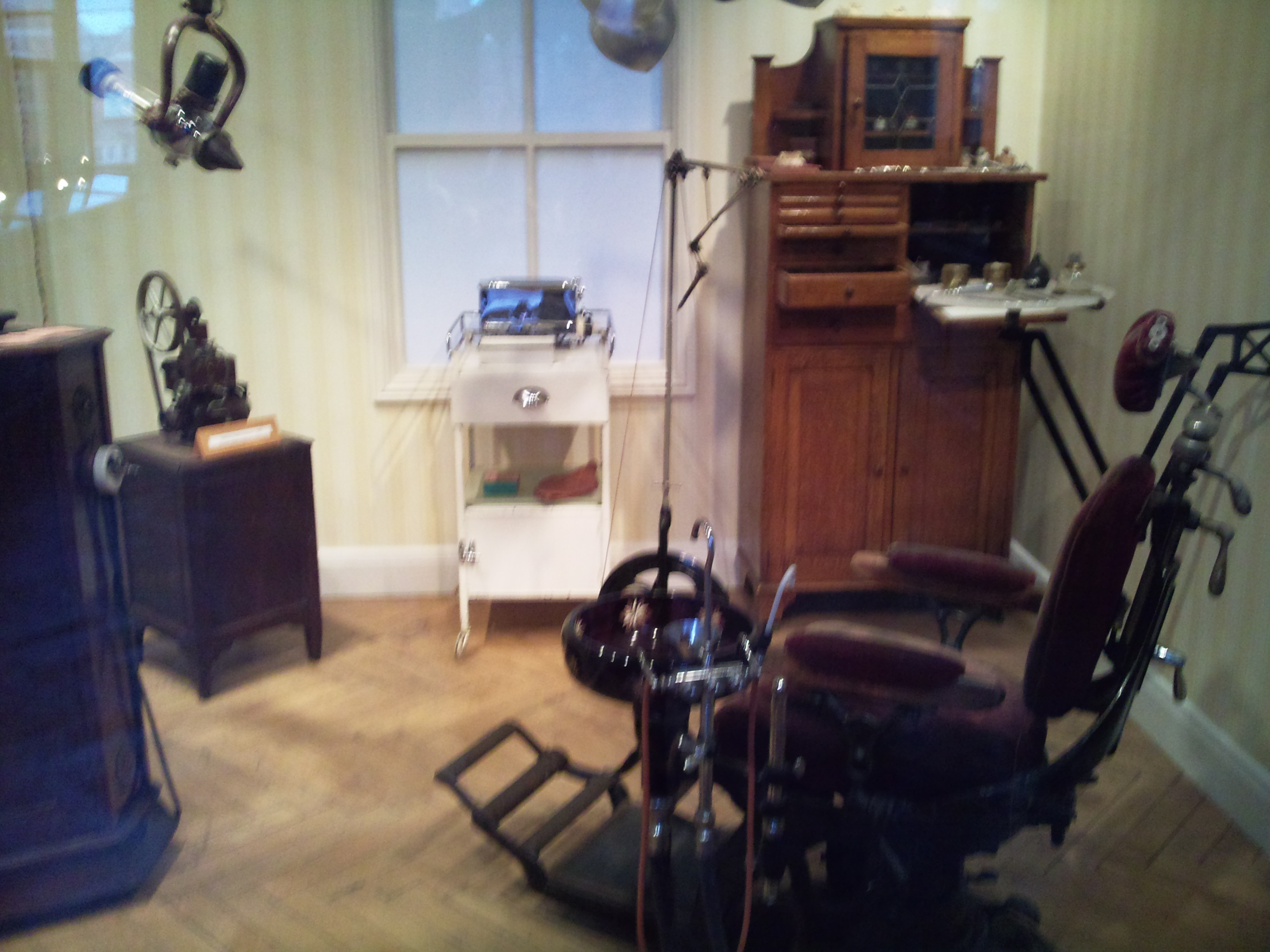
Display of Victorian Dental Practice in the VG&M

The museum has amassed a collection of artifacts reflecting the changing world of dentistry up to the present day. A collection of early textbooks on dentistry, instruments and dental furniture are also included. Until 2006 these were all housed in the Edwards Building, attached to the hospital; but the collection has moved to the university with some of this being on display in the Victoria Gallery & Museum located on the Liverpool Campus.

== Research ==
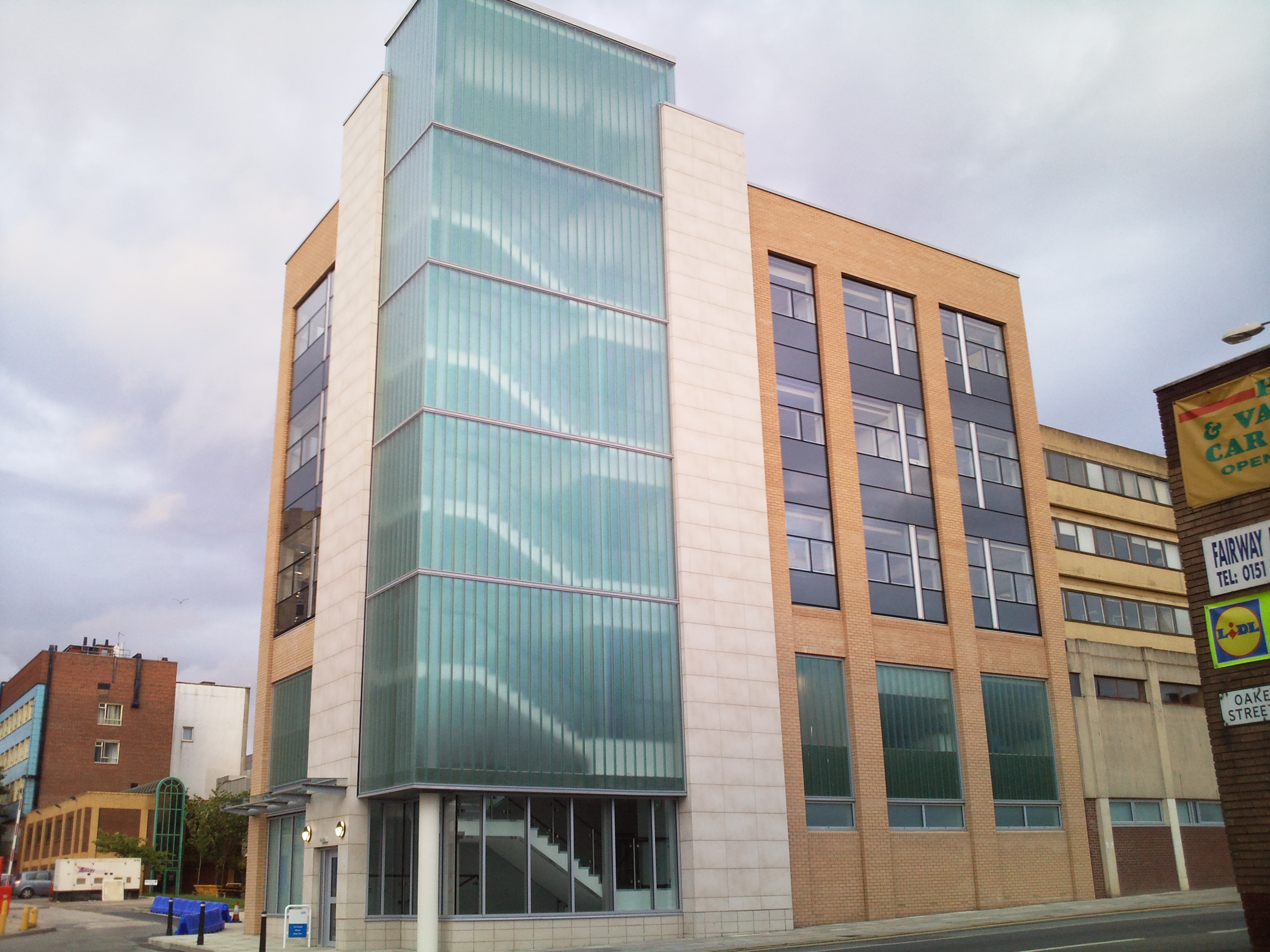
New extension of Dental Hospital containing sedation suite and research facilities

Liverpool Dental School research focuses on a wide range of discipline specific themes which are mainly embedded within the postgraduate professional Doctorate (DDSc) programme as well as educational research.

== List of deans ==
- Captain W J Newman – Founder – Liverpool Dispensary for diseases of the teeth 1860–1881
- W H Waite 1881–1888
- R Edwards 1888–1898
- W H Gilmour 1898–1935
- H H Stones 1935–1957
- F E Lawton KBE 1957–1980
- W M Oliver 1980–1986
- W R Tyldsley 1986–1989
- J Scott 1989–2001
- G Embery 2001–2003
- C M Pine CBE 2003 – 2008
- C C Youngson MBE 2008–2018
- V D Bissell 2018–2024
- L J Dawson 2025-present
