= Aintree University Hospital =

- Liverpool University Hospitals NHS Foundation Trust and NHS University Hospitals of Liverpool Group
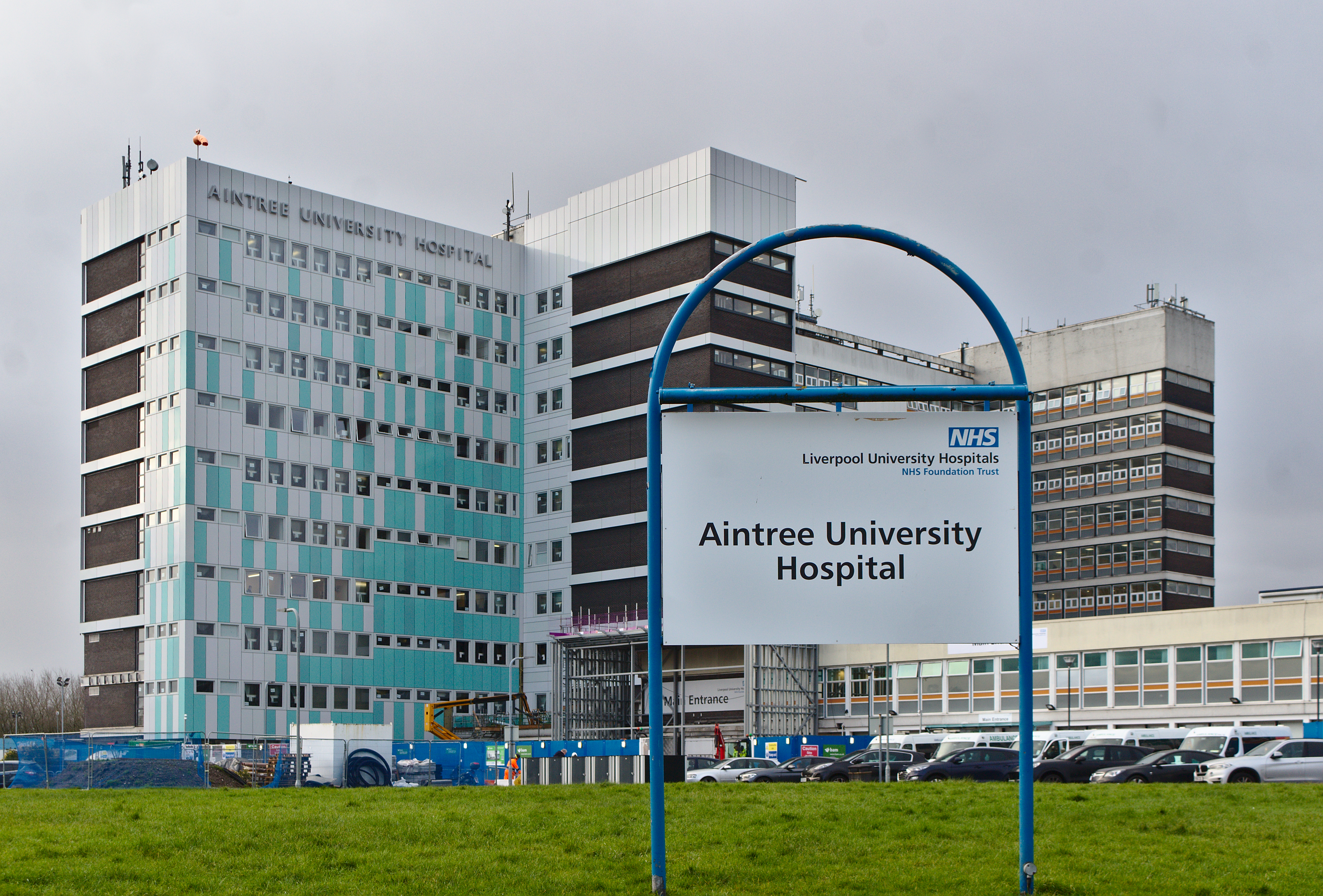
- Aintree University Hospital

- Shown in Merseyside

Geography
- Location: Lower Lane, Fazakerley, Liverpool, England
- Coordinates: 53.461606°N 2.943427°W

Organisation
- Care system: NHS England
- Type: Teaching
- Affiliated university: University of Liverpool; Liverpool John Moores University; Edge Hill University

Services
- Emergency department: Major Trauma Centre
- Beds: 712

History
- Founded: 1898

Links
- Website: www.uhliverpool.nhs.uk
- Lists: Hospitals in England

Aintree University Hospital (colloquially known as Fazakerley Hospital) is a National Health Service hospital in Fazakerley, Liverpool. It is part of NHS University Hospitals of Liverpool Group.

== History ==
In 1898 Liverpool Corporation acquired land from the Harbreck estate with which to build a hospital. The hospital, initially known as the "City Hospital North, Fazakerley, for Infectious Diseases" opened in 1906. During the First World War, the building was requisitioned by the War Office to create the 1st Western General Hospital, a facility for the Royal Army Medical Corps to treat military casualties. In 1920 the "Fazakerley Sanatorium" was opened on the hospital site, with 245 beds for tuberculoisis patients. It became the "Fazakerley Infectious Hospital" in 1947 and, after joining the National Health Service in 1948, became the Fazakerley Hospital in 1968. The maternity unit was completed in 1969 and, after a major-rebuilding programme, the hospital reopened as the "Fazakerley District General Hospital" in 1974. It became the "University Hospital Aintree" in 1999.

In July 2016 the hospital, together with the Walton Centre, became the single receiving site for major trauma patients in Merseyside. An expanded urgent care and trauma centre was officially opened by the Duke of Cambridge in September 2017.
