= Royal Liverpool University Hospital =

- Liverpool University Hospitals NHS Foundation Trust and NHS University Hospitals of Liverpool Group
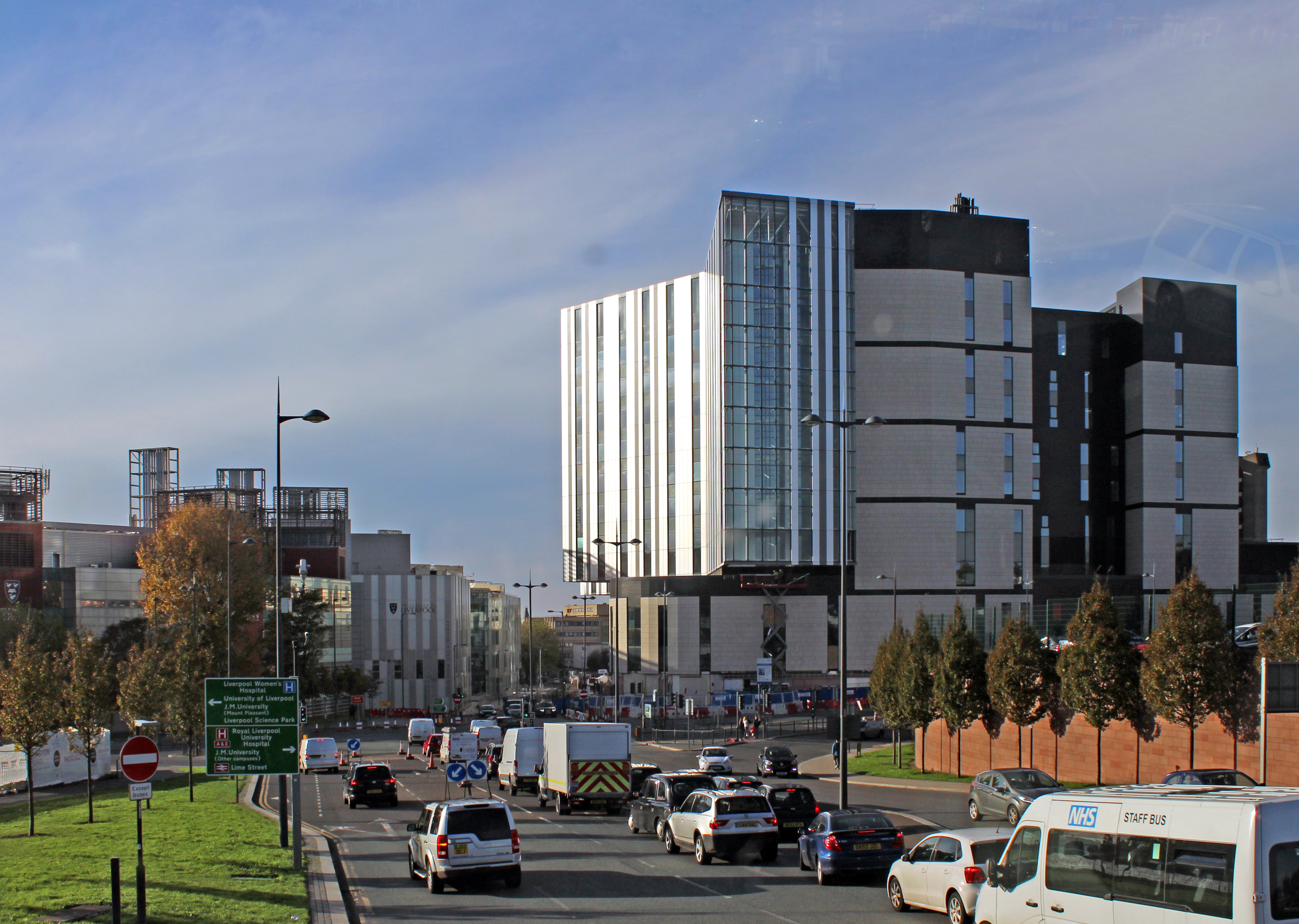
- Royal Liverpool University Hospital new building, viewed from Mount Vernon Road (opened 2022)

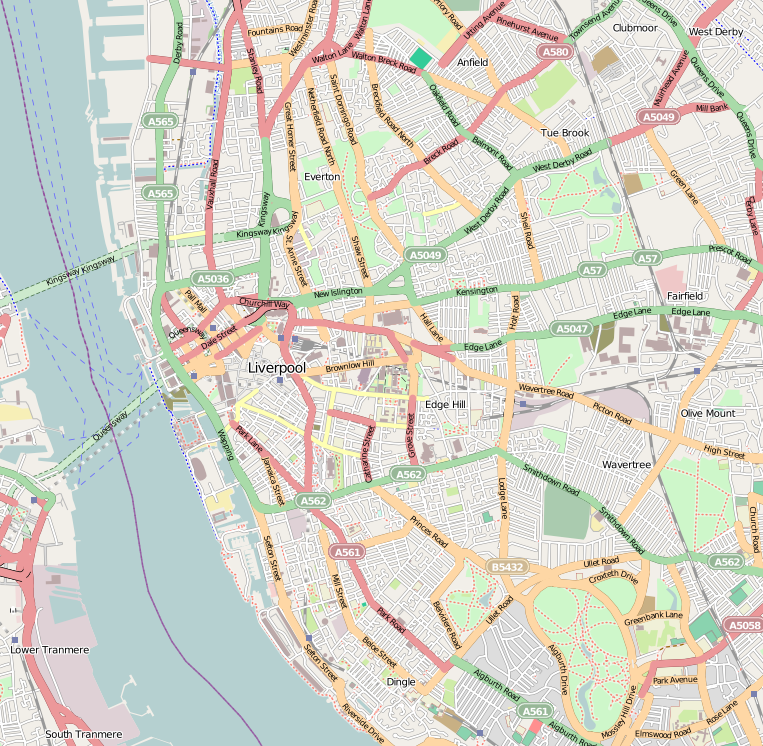
- Location in Liverpool Location in Merseyside

Geography
- Location: Mount Vernon Street, Liverpool, L7 8YE.
- Coordinates: 53.40944°N 2.96412°W

Organisation
- Care system: Public NHS
- Type: Teaching
- Affiliated university: University of Liverpool, Liverpool John Moores University, Liverpool School of Tropical Medicine

Services
- Emergency department: Yes Accident & Emergency
- Beds: 850
- Speciality: Organ Transplantation, Nephrology, Endocrinology, Ophthalmology, Vascular Surgery, Hepatology, Hepatobiliary Surgery, Orthopaedics, Oncology, Respiratory Medicine, Regional Tropical and Infectious Disease Unit

History
- Founded: 1978 (Old); 20 October 2022 (New)
- Closed: 19 October 2022 (Old)

Links
- Website: www.uhliverpool.nhs.uk

Royal Liverpool University Hospital (RLUH) is a major teaching and research hospital located in the city of Liverpool, England. It is the largest and busiest hospital in Merseyside.

A major redevelopment of the hospital began in 2013 and was scheduled for completion in 2017, but construction problems and the 2018 collapse of main contractor Carillion meant it did not open until late 2022.

The hospital is part of NHS University Hospitals of Liverpool Group and is associated with the University of Liverpool, Liverpool John Moores University and the Liverpool School of Tropical Medicine.

== History ==
=== Former hospital ===
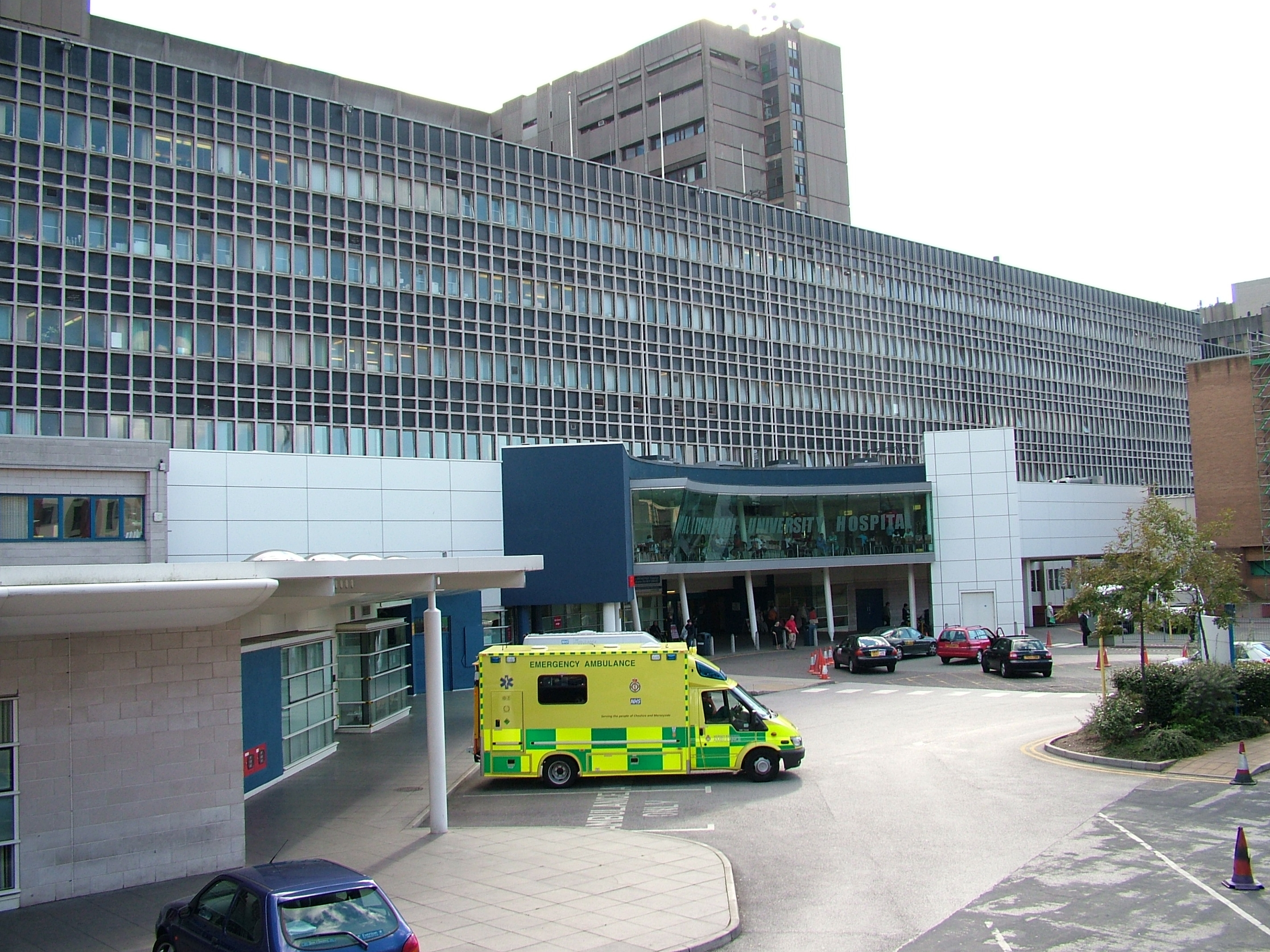
Main Entrance and Emergency Department at the former Royal Liverpool University Hospital (completed in 1978)

The former hospital, originally known simply as the Royal Liverpool Hospital, was designed to replace three other city centre acute hospitals that existed at the time – the Liverpool Royal Infirmary on Pembroke Place, the David Lewis Northern Hospital on Great Howard Street, and the Royal Southern Hospital on Caryl Street. It had been agreed to amalgamate the separate facilities on a site in close proximity to the University of Liverpool for the purposes of medical education and research. The site on which the current hospital now stands (on Prescot Street) was identified as part of the post-war regeneration of Liverpool. However, building on the main hospital did not commence until 1963. The first phase of the hospital was designed by Holford Associates and built by Alfred McAlpine between 1963 and 1969. The construction was plagued from the outset by problems of cost, time and quality, together with difficulties over fire certification due to changes in health and safety law whilst building work was ongoing. The second phase was completed and the hospital eventually opened in 1978.

=== Redevelopment ===
In December 2013, the landmark £429 million redevelopment of the Royal Liverpool University Hospital, procured under a Private Finance Initiative contract, reached financial close; its collaborative links with the University of Liverpool, and institutes on the Liverpool BioCampus, have given the city of Liverpool recognition as one of the leading UK centres for health research and innovation. The new Royal Liverpool University Hospital, which was designed by NBBJ and HKS and was being built by Carillion, was expected to be the largest all single-patient room hospital in the UK upon its originally scheduled completion of March 2017.

In March 2017, the project was running more than a year late due to problems caused by asbestos, cracking concrete and bad weather, and further delays were announced in early January 2018. Less than a fortnight later, on 15 January 2018, Carillion went into liquidation, partly due to its problems with the hospital contract, and delaying the project still further, with the hospital unlikely to be finished in 2018. On 26 March 2018, it was reported that the project had been costing £53.9M more than Carillion had officially reported. In September, the NHS Trust revealed that the cost of rectifying serious faults, including replacing non-compliant cladding installed by Carillion, was holding up plans to restart and finish the £350M project; with the project further delayed, the Trust was considering invoking a break clause to terminate the PFI contract. On 24 September 2018, it was reported that the government would step in to terminate the PFI deal, taking the hospital into full public ownership, meaning a £180M loss for private sector lenders Legal & General and the European Investment Bank. This was confirmed on 26 September 2018, with completion of the hospital in 2020 likely to cost an additional £120M, due to unforeseen issues left behind by Carillion.

Construction work was expected to resume in November 2018. On 25 October 2018 Laing O'Rourke was confirmed as the contractor to complete the project, but, a month later, with the contractor not prepared to take any risk, Mace was also appointed to help manage risks associated with the £350M scheme. In April 2019, the project was reported to be facing further delays due to subcontractors' reluctance to work on the scheme, while further defects were detected in May 2019, with rectification also likely to delay completion and increase costs.

On 17 December 2019, hospital CEO Steve Warburton confirmed the project had been further delayed until at least 2022 and that patients and staff would be at the existing hospital for the next three winters. In addition to £285M already spent, Warburton said completion would cost £300M, including costs to replace an aluminium composite cladding system, which, since the Grenfell Tower fire, was known to breach building regulations. In March 2020, the hospital NHS Trust revealed it was drawing up claims against Carillion's insurers and a Carillion subcontractor Heyrod Construction. In June 2020, the Portuguese manufacturer of the cladding was drafted in to remove it.

A delayed National Audit Office report into the government's handling of the Royal Liverpool and Midland Metropolitan University Hospitals was published in January 2020. The report warned of possible further significant cost increases, particularly to rectify the badly-built Liverpool project, and blamed Carillion for pricing the jobs too low to meet specifications. The two projects were expected to cost more than 40% more than their original budgets, and to be completed between three and five years late. However, due to effective risk transfer to the contractor, the total cost to the taxpayer would be very similar to the original plan.

Part of the new hospital was opened early in May 2020 to provide additional critical care capacity during the COVID-19 pandemic in the United Kingdom. In June 2022, the NHS Trust said the hospital was scheduled to open in September or October 2022. The NHS Trust took partial possession of the new building on 11 July, with a 24-day moving-in period set to run from 28 September to 21 October 2022.

In October 2022, the trust said that the old hospital building would permanently close at 23:59 on 19 October 2022 with the A&E department at the new site taking their first patients from 00:00 on 20 October 2022. The old hospital had 685 beds. The new hospital has 640 beds and there are 21 'transfer of care' beds opening at the nearby Broadgreen Hospital site, with a further 10 beds in the community - a net reduction of 14 beds.

In January 2023, the BBC reported that senior medics at the hospital claimed to be "embarrassed, ashamed and demoralised" by the care they can give at the new A&E, calling the department "overcrowded, chaotic and unpleasant". In the same article, it is claimed that costs are expected to reach over £1 billion, up from an initial estimate of £335 million.

Between 2023 and 2025, demolition works took place at the old hospital building.

== Rating ==
In 2007, the Healthcare Commission rated Royal Liverpool and Broadgreen University Hospitals NHS Trust "Good" for 'Quality of Services' and Good for 'Use of Resources'. In 2009, Royal Liverpool and Broadgreen University Hospitals NHS Trust was rated "Excellent" for the quality of its services and the quality of its financial management.

== Teaching and research ==
The Royal Liverpool University Hospital is a major teaching and research hospital for student doctors, nurses, dentists and allied health professionals. The hospital works with the University of Liverpool, Liverpool John Moores University and the Liverpool School of Tropical Medicine.

== See also ==
- List of hospitals in England
- Knowledge Quarter, Liverpool
- Healthcare in Merseyside
