= Knowledge Quarter, Liverpool =

Science and education district of Liverpool UK

Coordinates: 53.405°N 2.969°W

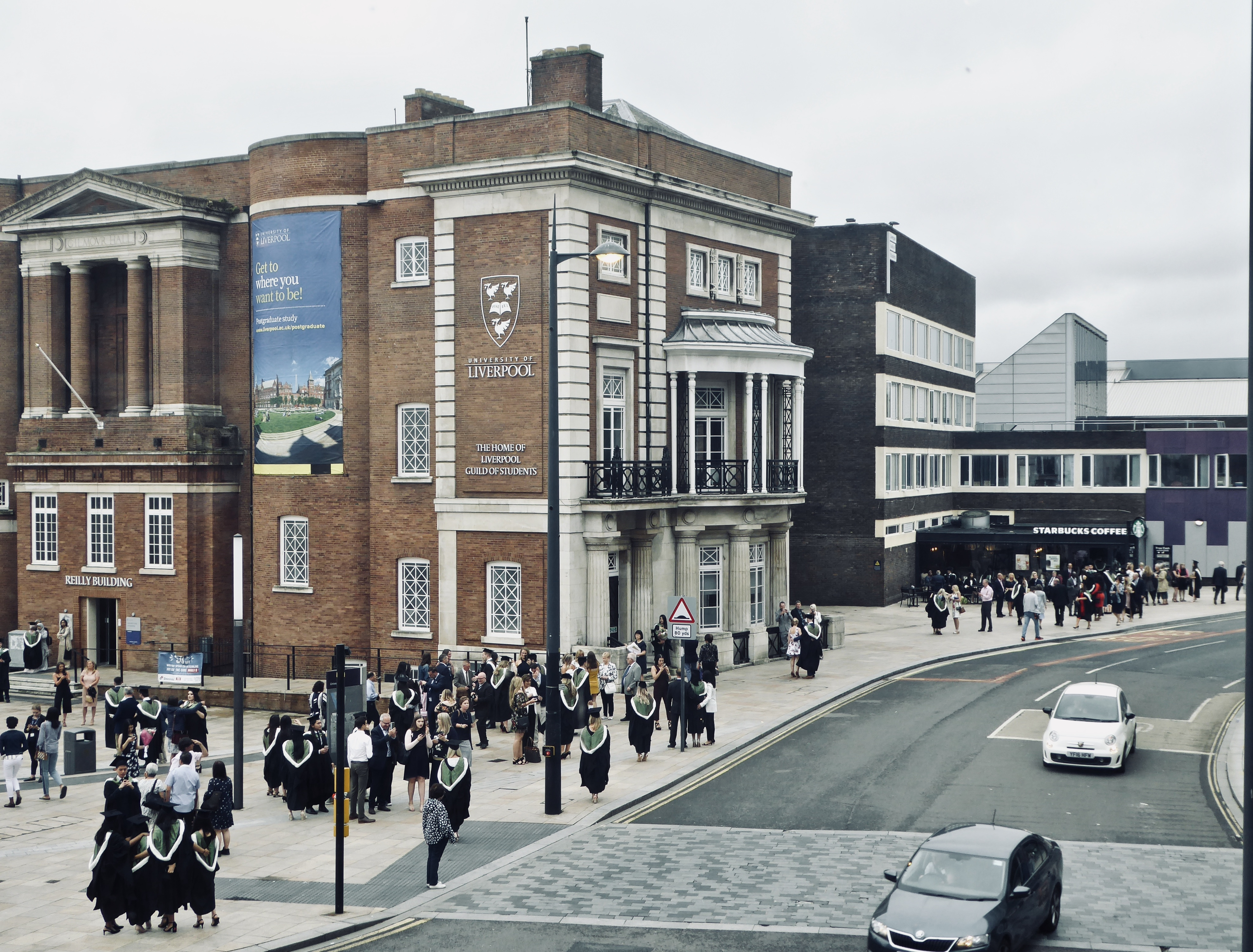
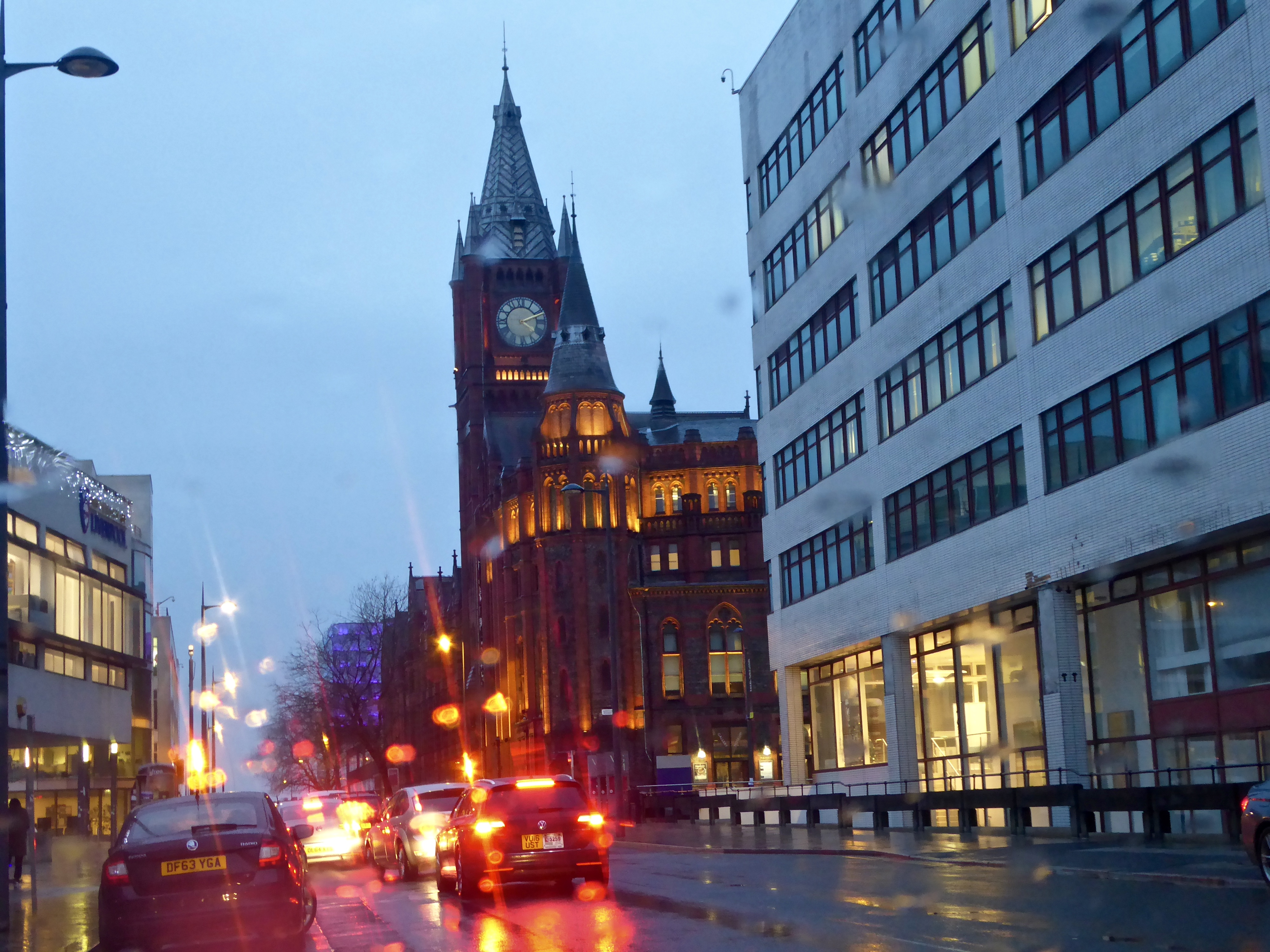
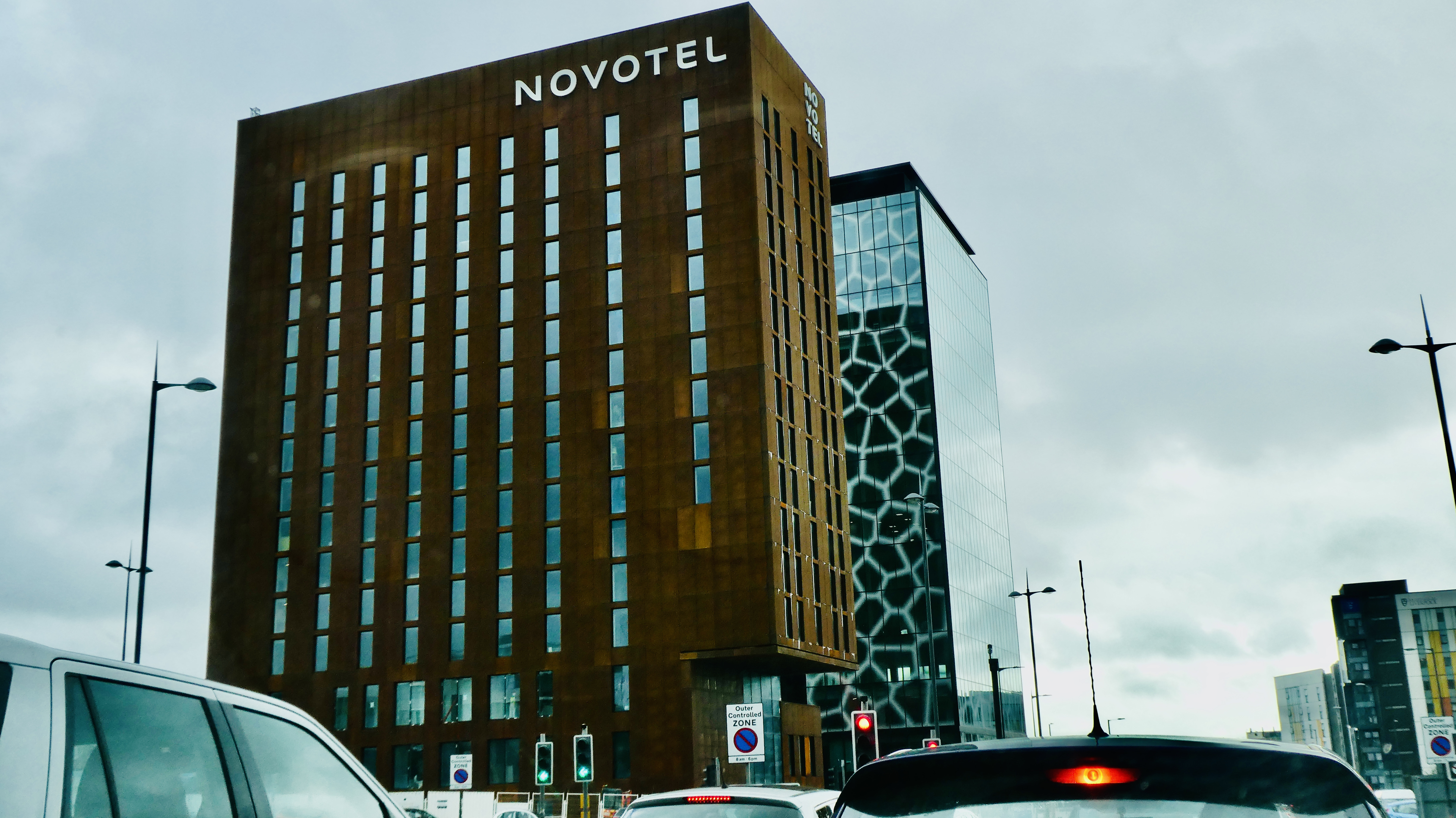
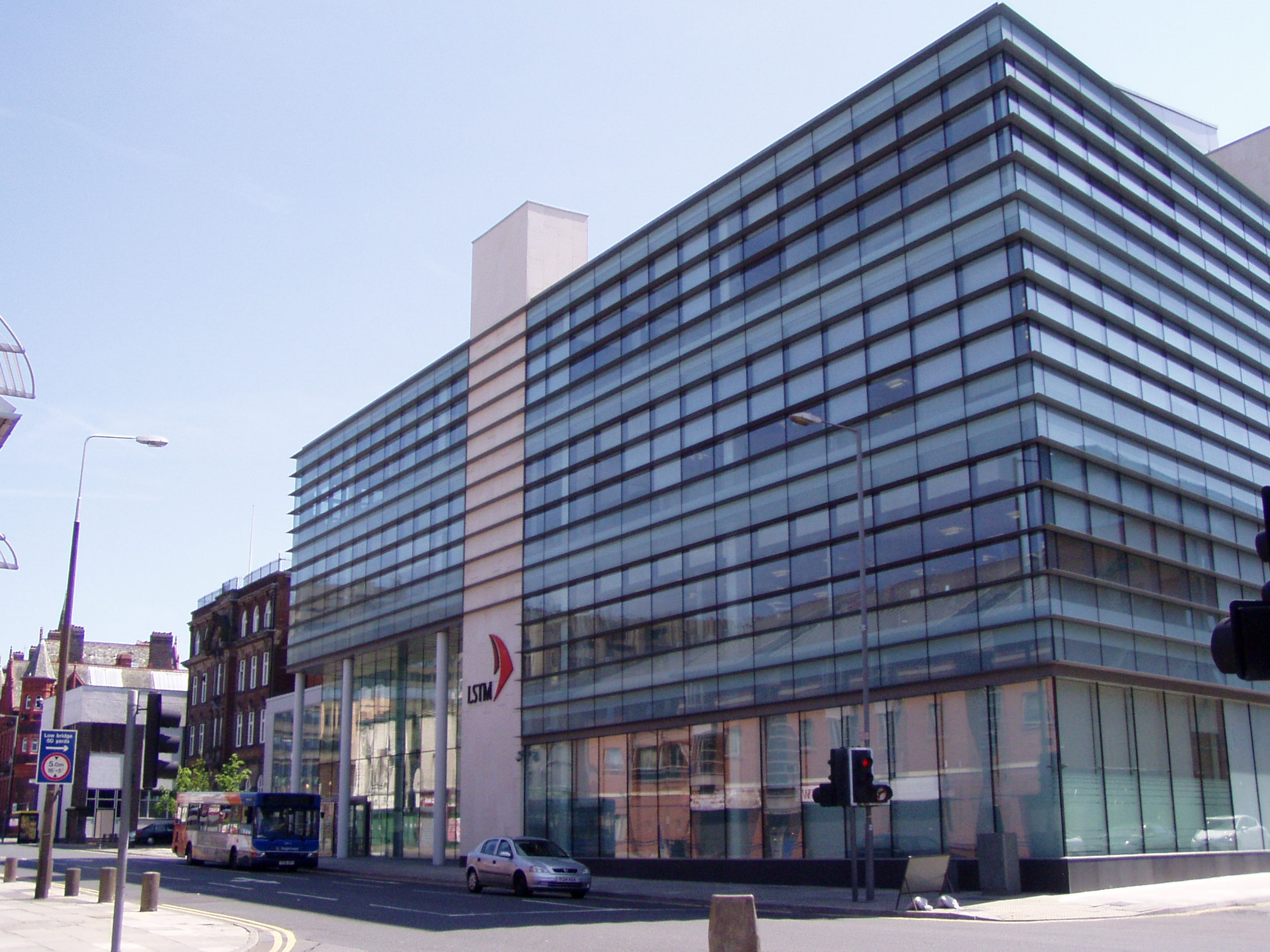
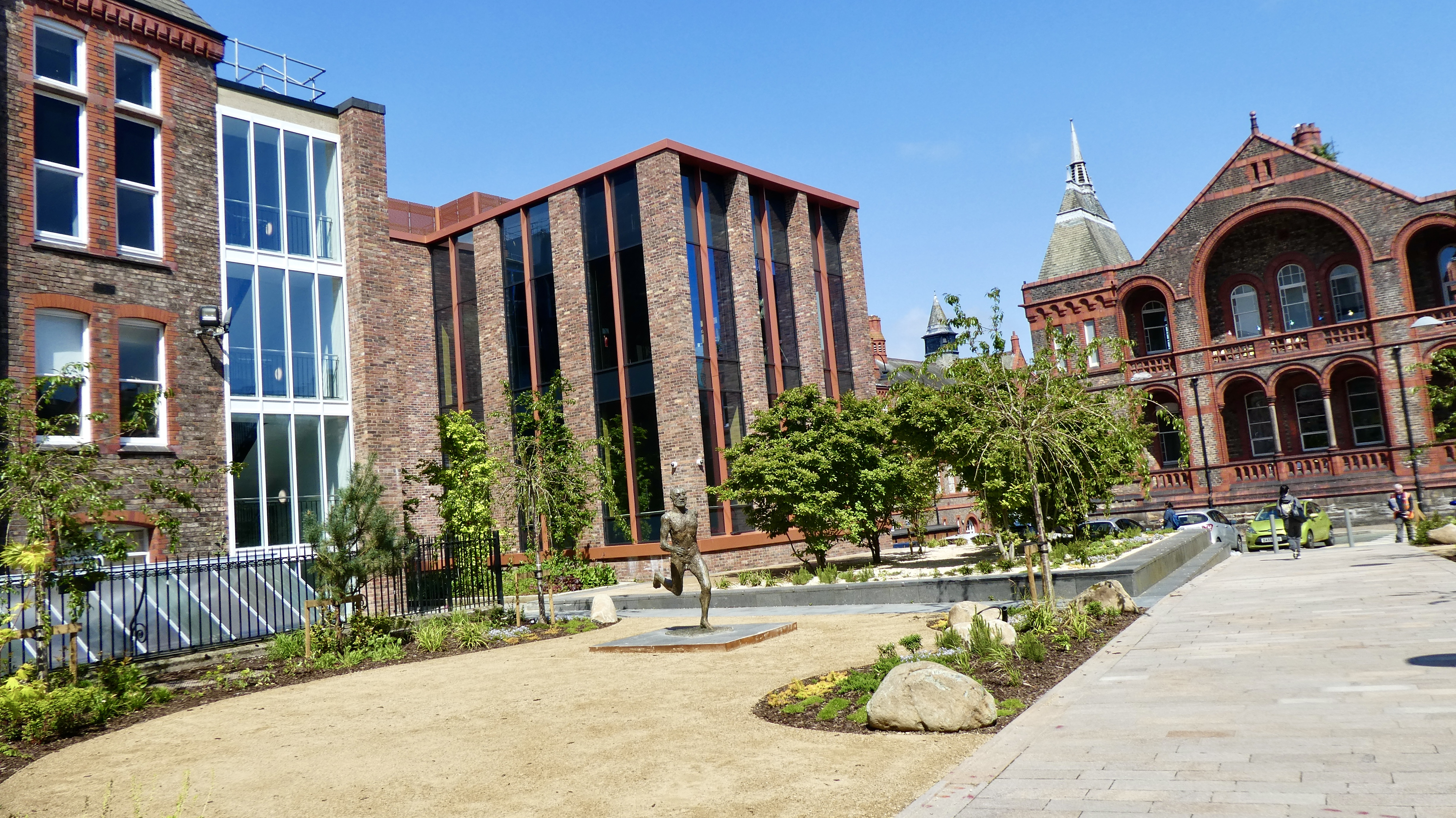
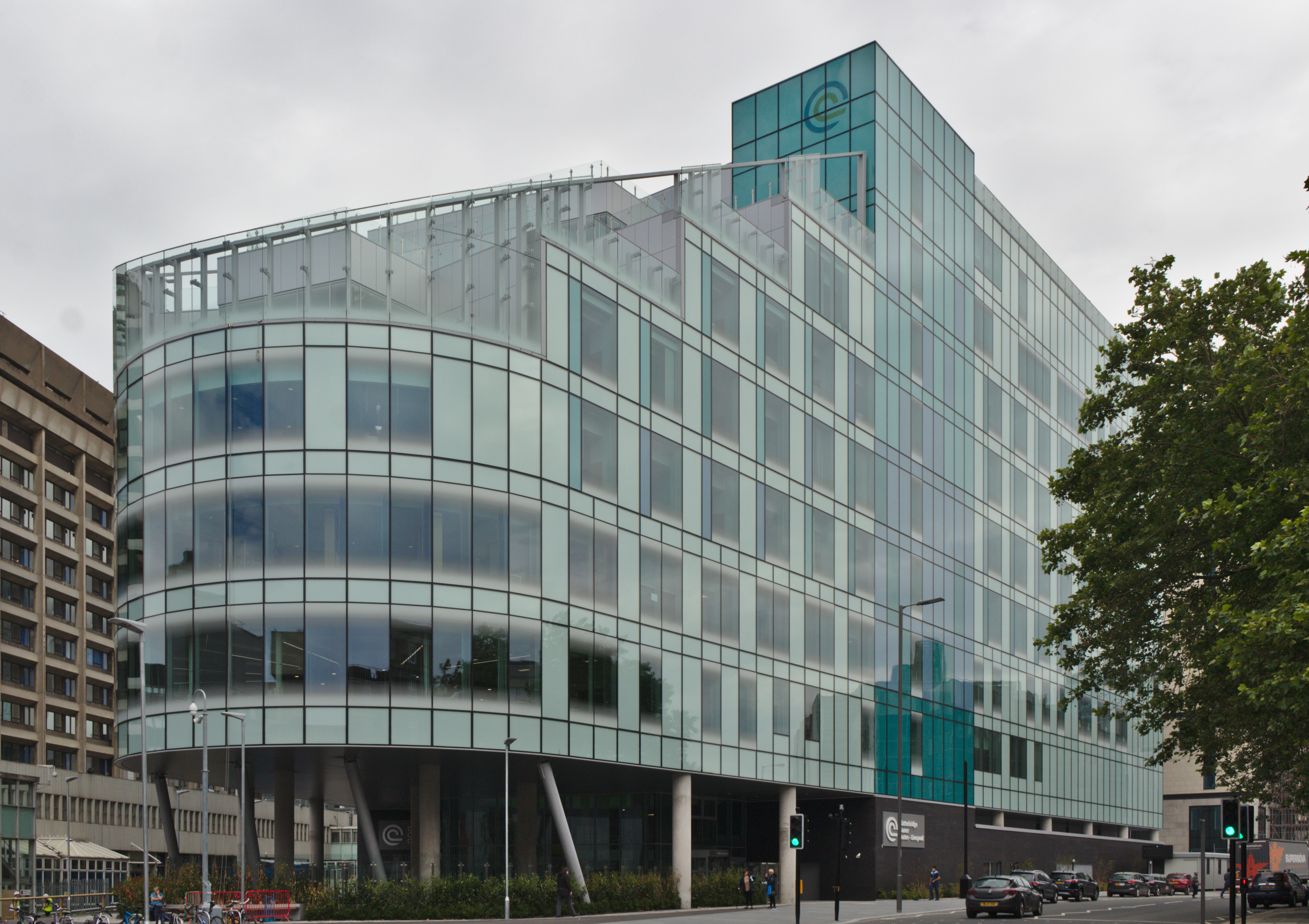
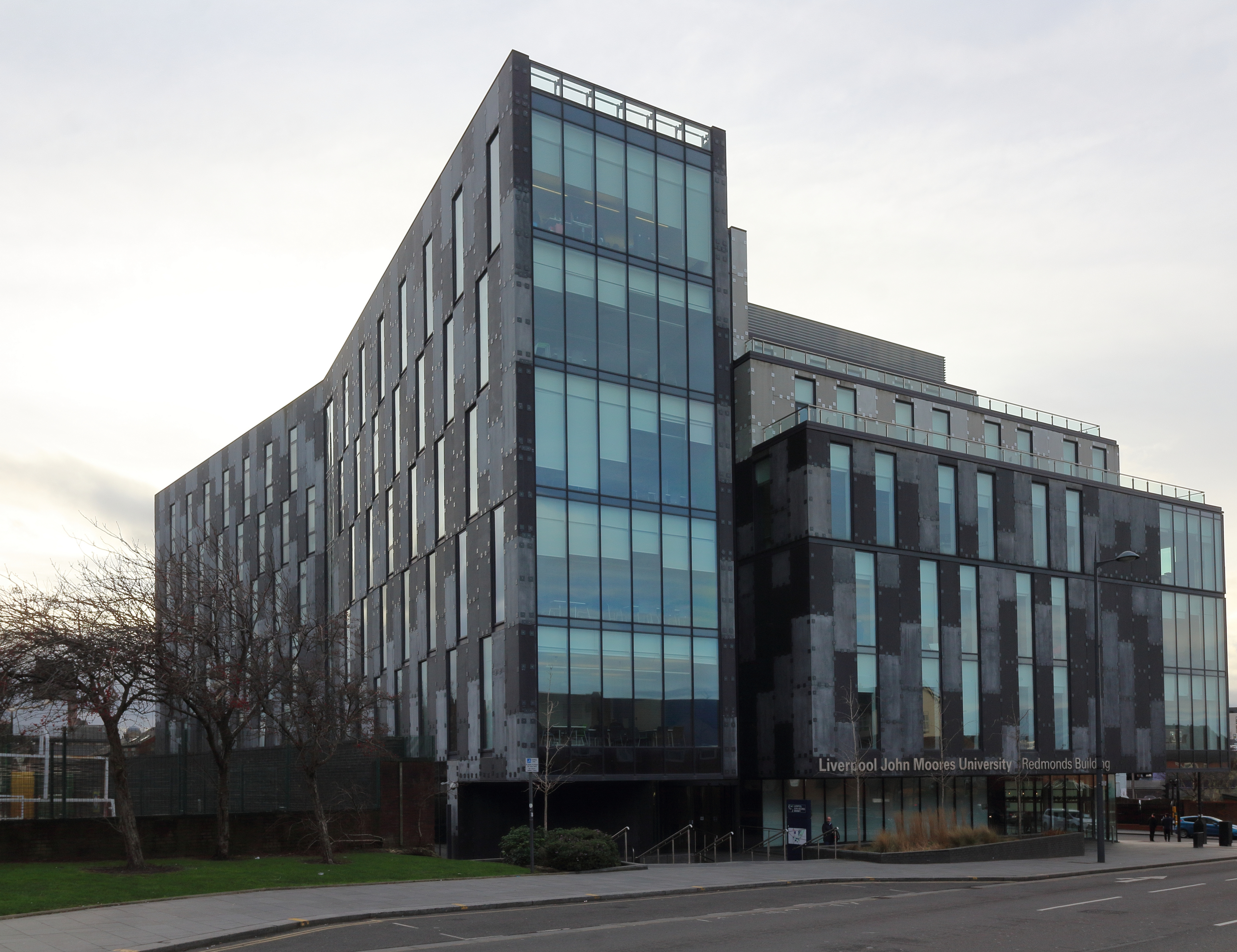
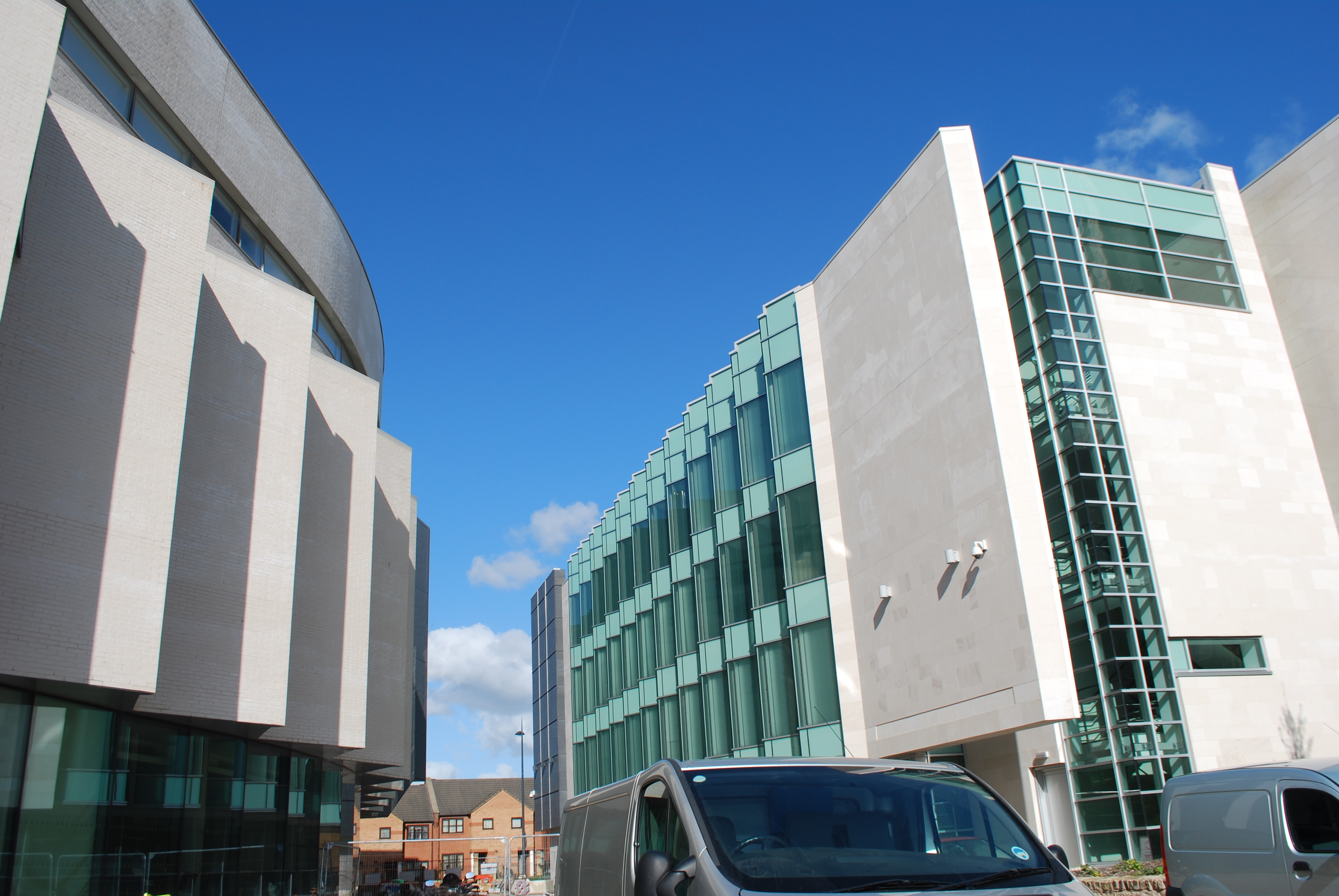
- Clockwise from top left: Liverpool Guild of Students; Victoria Gallery & Museum; Paddington Village; Liverpool School of Tropical Medicine; University of Liverpool; The Clatterbridge Cancer Centre; LJMU Redmonds Building and John Lennon Art and Design Building

- Location within Merseyside
- OS grid reference: SJ3558790264
- Metropolitan borough: Liverpool
- Metropolitan county: Merseyside
- Region: North West
- Country: England
- Sovereign state: United Kingdom
- Post town: Liverpool
- Postcode district: L1, L3, L7
- Dialling code: 0151
- Police: Merseyside
- Fire: Merseyside
- Ambulance: North West
- UK Parliament: Liverpool Riverside

The Knowledge Quarter is an innovation district covering 450 acres of the Liverpool city centre, incorporating the vicinity around London Road, Islington, the Fabric District, Paddington Village and part of Canning.

The Knowledge Quarter contains a number of institutions that operate within the knowledge economy. Some of the institutions within the area include the University of Liverpool, Liverpool John Moores University, Royal Liverpool University Hospital, Liverpool School of Tropical Medicine, Royal College of Physicians and various others across Liverpool Science Park and Paddington Village.

== Background and development ==
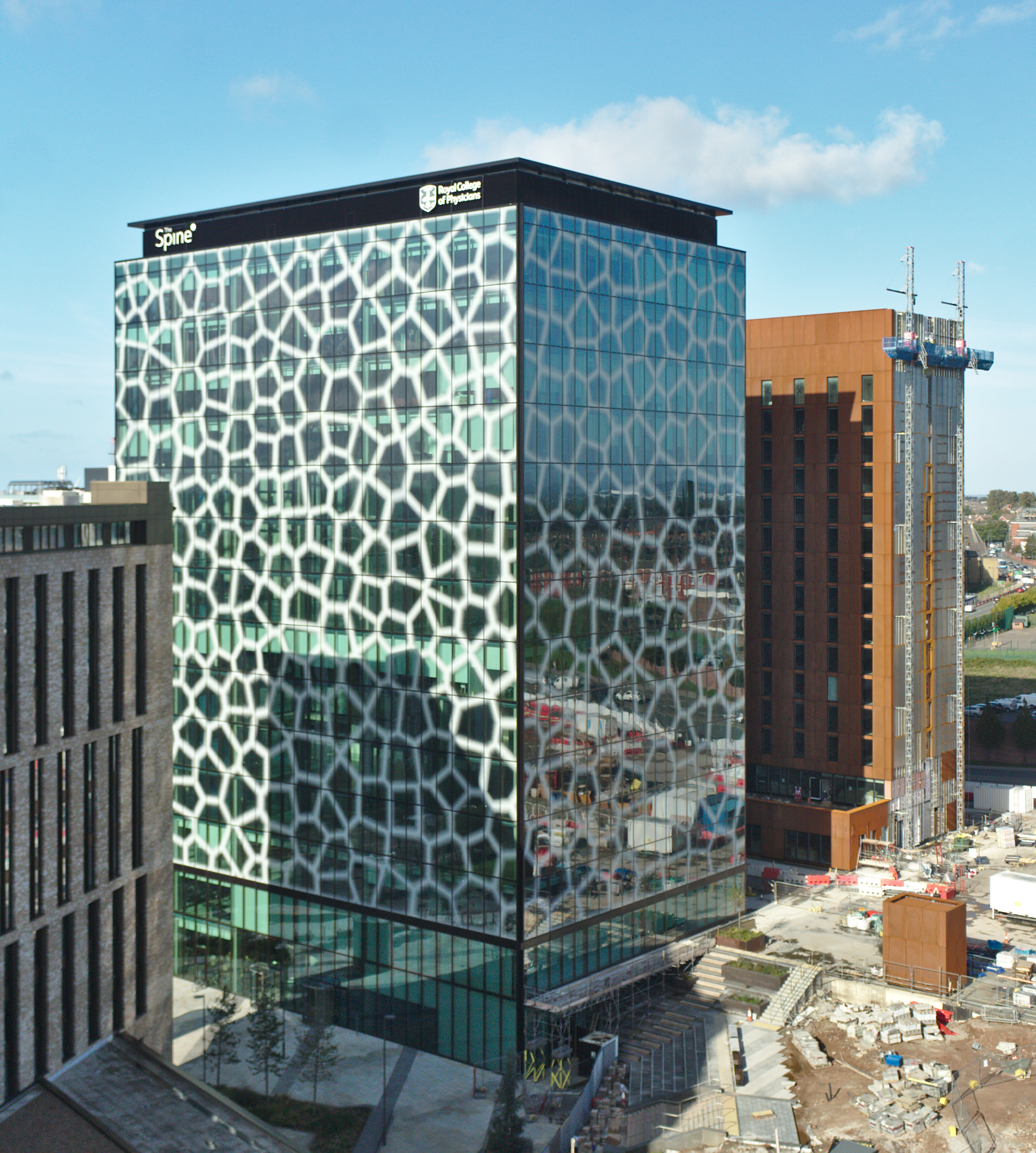
The Spine and Novotel under construction at Paddington Village in 2021

Since the mid-2000s, the Knowledge Quarter has been the subject of numerous Liverpool City Council masterplans and frameworks which have helped to cultivate the area's status as an innovation district based on science, technology, education, medicine and culture. Such plans have encouraged billions of pounds worth of investment and have informed redevelopment, which is ongoing today.

Early plans emerged in 2006 to incorporate Hope Street and Islington in to the Knowledge Quarter, Liverpool Vision (now defunct) followed with the publication of a prospectus to encourage collaboration between the district's various academic institutions in 2007. Various plans to advise on streetscape and public realm improvements came about in 2008. The Liverpool Knowledge Quarter Strategic Investment Framework was formulated in 2011 to promote the area's branding and development. In 2011/2012, Liverpool Vision continued to target the area for economic growth, job creation and attracting businesses in health and life sciences.

2013 saw the expansion of Liverpool Science Park with additional offices and laboratory space. Mayor Joe Anderson proposed the area's expansion in 2015 in to what is now known as Village. KQ Liverpool launched in 2016 as a collaboration between Liverpool City Council, the University of Liverpool, Liverpool John Moores University, The Liverpool School of Tropical Medicine and the Royal Liverpool and Broadgreen University NHS Trust, to promote the Knowledge Quarter as one of Europe's leading innovation districts. Additional planning frameworks followed.

Liverpool's most recent Local Plan aims to build on the economic potential of the Knowledge Quarter and to bring under-utilised, vacant land and buildings back into productive use. London Road will be developed, a growing residential community around Islington will be encouraged and Village will be expanded. The public realm, connectivity and infrastructure across the area will also be improved. In 2024, the UK central government pledged millions of pounds worth of investment to encourage more regeneration and life science laboratories at Paddington Village. The Guardian reported in 2025 that Liverpool City Region had 167 life-science companies employing more than 6,000 people, while the Life Sciences Investment Zone was expected to attract up to £800 million and create 8,000 jobs.

== Location ==
Liverpool's Knowledge Quarter covers a large portion of Liverpool city centre. At the north west corner is the Liverpool John Moores University James Parsons Building, at the north east is the Royal Liverpool University Hospital, to the south east is Liverpool Women's Hospital and to the west is Liverpool Lime Street station. The boundary is marked by Tithebarn Street and Islington to the north, Paddington Village to the east, Upper Parliament Street to the south and Renshaw Street to the west. The quarter incorporates several different areas of the city centre including Islington (sometimes referred to as the Fabric District), the area around London Road, Paddington Village, parts of Canning, the University of Liverpool and Liverpool John Moore's University campuses.

According to Liverpool's most recent Local Plan, the Knowledge Quarter has been set aside by Liverpool City Council as a special designated area to promote offices, research and laboratory facilities for science, technology, education, medicine and culture based businesses.

== Notable institutions ==
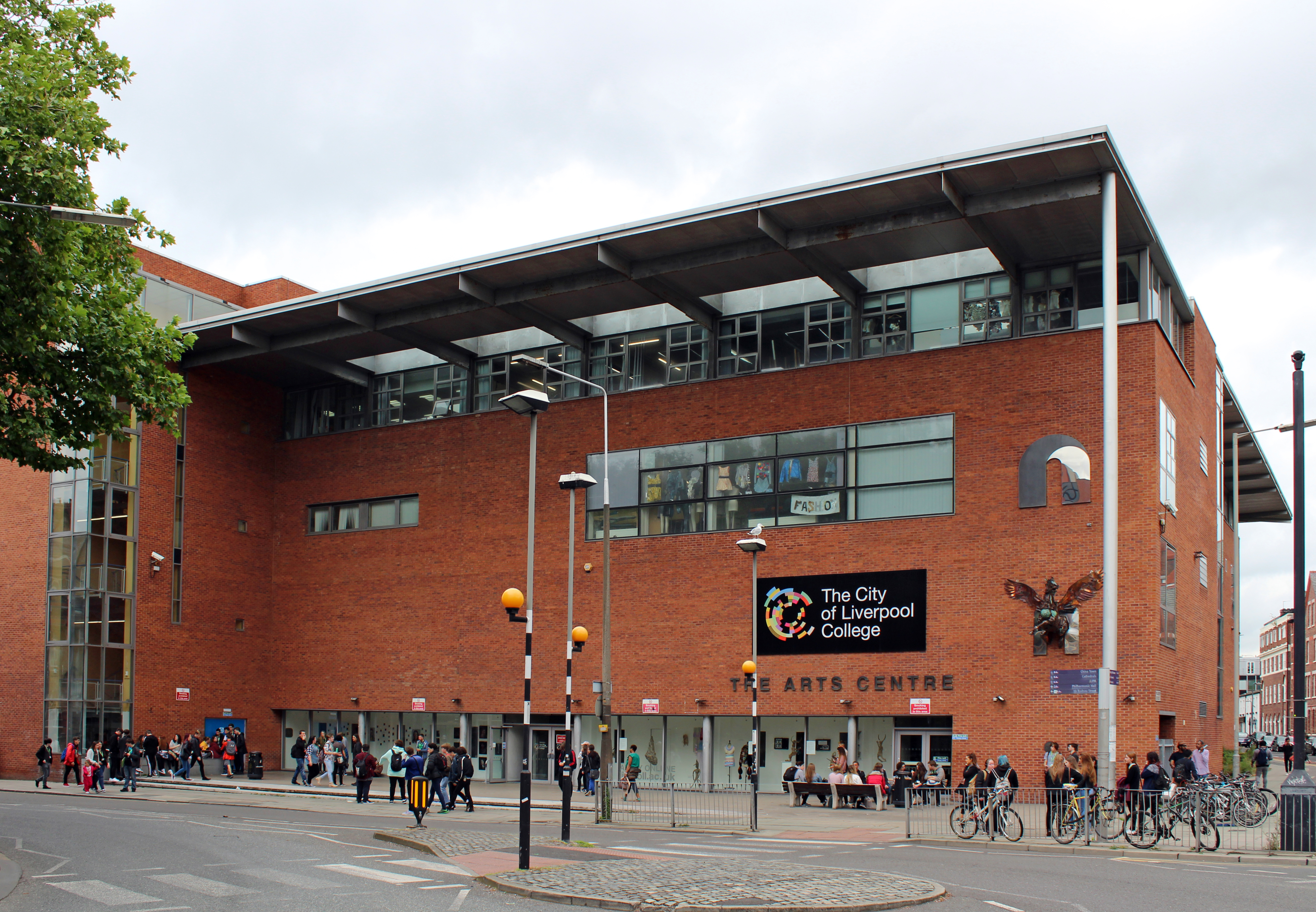
The City of Liverpool College campus on Catherine Street

=== The City of Liverpool College ===
The City of Liverpool College is the largest further education college in the Liverpool City Region and is spread across five city centre campuses. Established in 1992, the college provides courses for somewhere between 12,000 and 20,000 students every year. The college also provides higher education programmes.

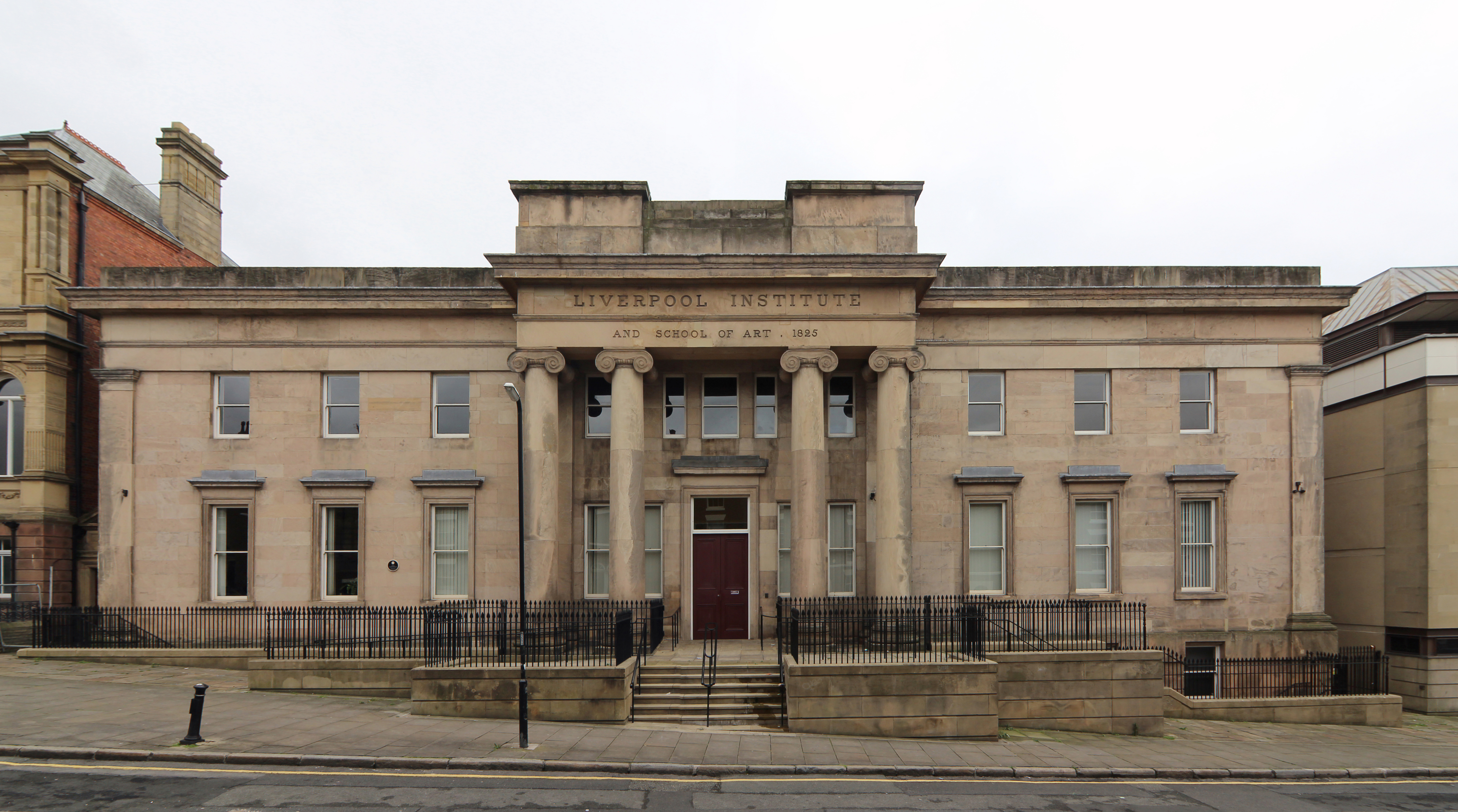
Front elevation of the Liverpool Institute for Performing Arts on Mount Street

=== Liverpool Institute for Performing Arts (LIPA) ===
The Liverpool Institute for Performing Arts is a world renowned higher education institution that was established in 1996 by Paul McCartney and Mark Featherstone-Witty. The institution offers university level creative and performing arts training to an international community of performers, creatives, technicians, filmmakers and business people. The main LIPA building is housed in the former Liverpool Institute High School for Boys.

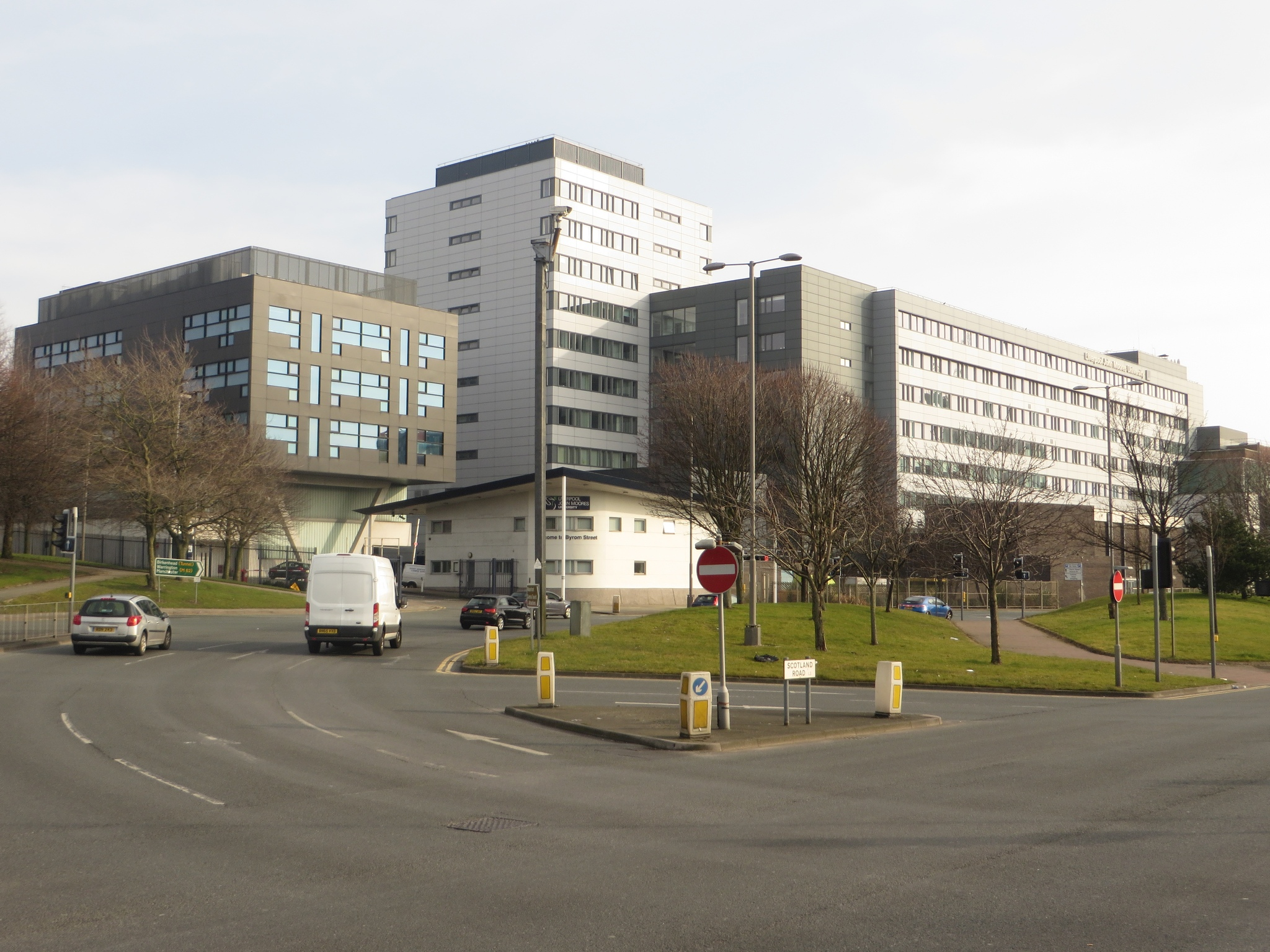
Liverpool John Moores University building on Byrom Street, Liverpool city centre

=== Liverpool John Moores University (LJMU) ===
Liverpool John Moores University (LJMU) is one of the largest universities in the UK and is home to over 25,000 students from more than 100 countries. LJMU was founded in 1825 as Liverpool Mechanics' School of Arts, over the next century it merged with various other colleges to become Liverpool Polytechnic and in 1992 was granted university status as one of the United Kingdom's many 'new universities'. It took its name from Liverpool entrepreneur and philanthropist, Sir John Moores. The university is arranged over two city centre campuses (City Campus and Mount Pleasant Campus) and is divided in to five faculties covering arts, professional and social studies; health; science; engineering and technology; business and law. The Mount Pleasant Campus is situated within the Knowledge Quarter. Mass regeneration of LJMU has occurred since the start of the 21st century, amongst some of the university's newest properties are the Avril and Aldham Robarts libraries, Tom Reilly Building, the John Lennon Art and Design Building, the Clarence Street Building and the Student Life and Sports Building at Copperas Hill.

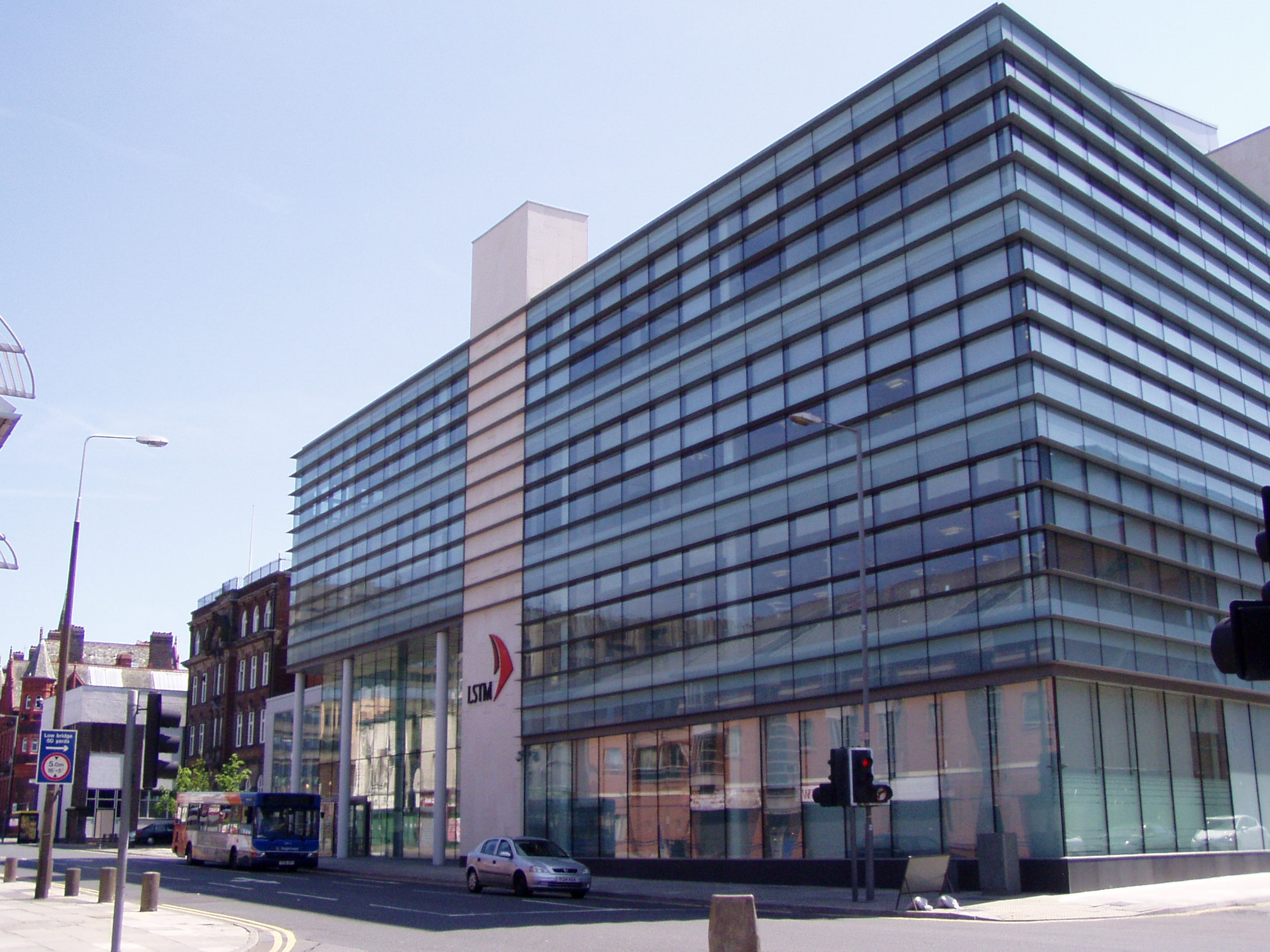
Liverpool School of Tropical Medicine

=== Liverpool School of Tropical Medicine (LSTM) ===
The Liverpool School of Tropical Medicine is one of the world's most important centres in treating malaria and other insect-borne diseases. It was founded in 1898 as the first such school of its kind in the world and today hosts the largest concentration of medical entomologists in the UK. The school has made many contributions to tropical medicine, most notably the identification of the vector for malaria by Ronald Ross (who eventually went on the win a Nobel Prize for his discovery). The University of Liverpool and Liverpool School of Tropical Medicine have also combined expertise to create the Centre of Excellence in Infectious Diseases Research (CEIDR) to improve global healthcare and medical technologies. Research at the CEIDR is funded by the Bill & Melinda Gates Foundation.

=== Liverpool Science Park ===
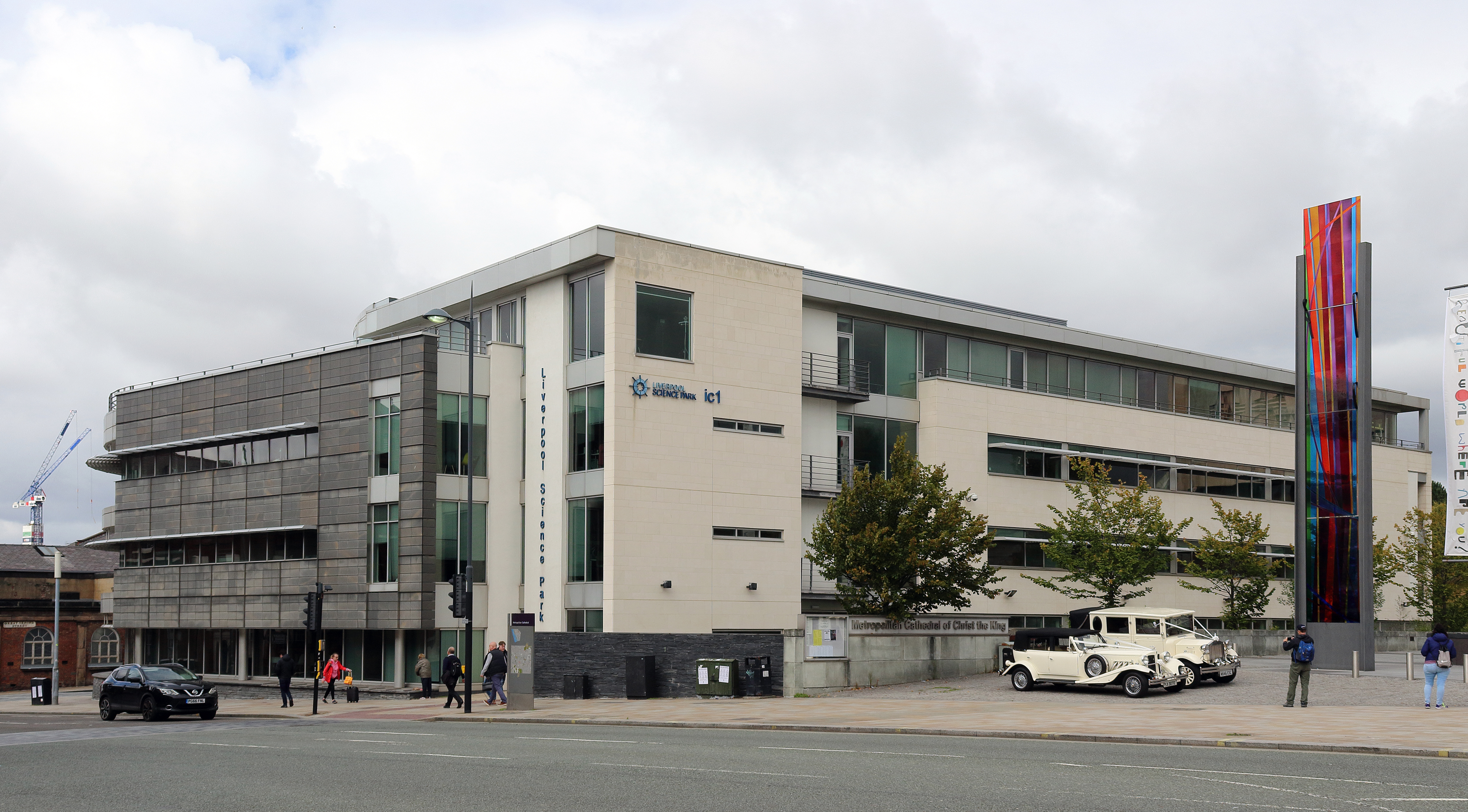
IC1 building at Liverpool Science Park, Mount Pleasant

Liverpool Science Park, between Mount Pleasant and Brownlow Hill, was established in 2006 and is home to over 60 science, technology and knowledge-based businesses. The park provides offices and laboratories across three buildings. Some of the businesses include LJMU's Astrophysics Research Institute; the University of Liverpool’s Institute of Infection, Veterinary and Ecological Sciences; the Innovation Agency; the National Measurement Laboratory and the Manufacturing Technology Centre's northern England base. In May 2025, Liverpool Science Park reached back full laboratory occupancy again after letting 5,000 sq ft of lab space to Pierian, ReNewVax, and another University of Liverpool spin-out.

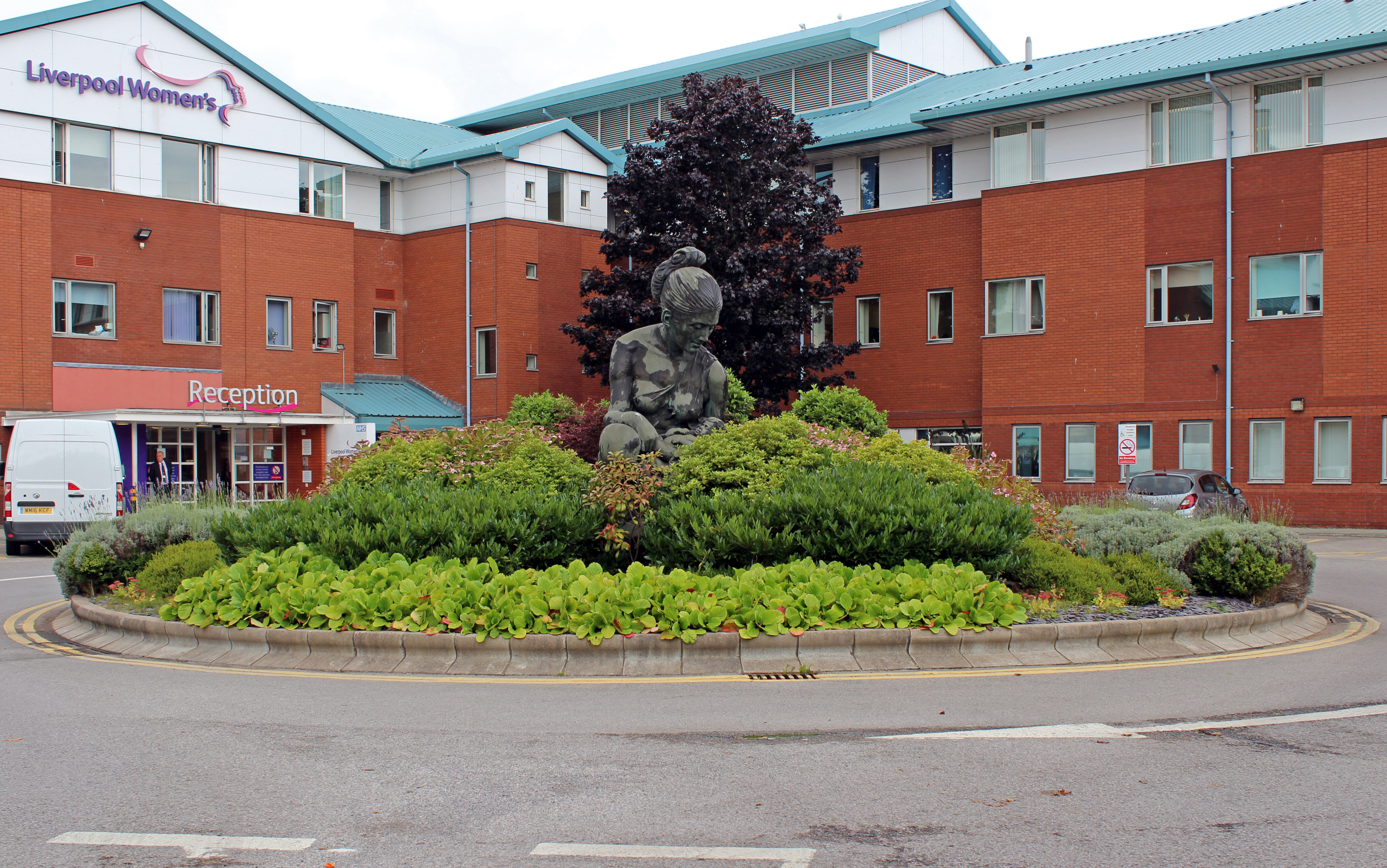
Liverpool Women's Hospital entrance

=== Liverpool Women's Hospital ===
The Liverpool Women's Hospital was built in 1995 after The Liverpool Maternity Hospital, The Women's Hospital and Mill Road Hospital merged to become the Liverpool Obstetrics and Gynaecology Unit ten years earlier. Liverpool Women's is one of only two such hospitals in the United Kingdom, as well as being the largest hospital in Europe devoted entirely to women's health. Maternity services, gynaecology, gynaecologic oncology, neonatology, reproductive medicine and genetics services are all available at the hospital, which is located in the very south-eastern corner of the Knowledge Quarter.

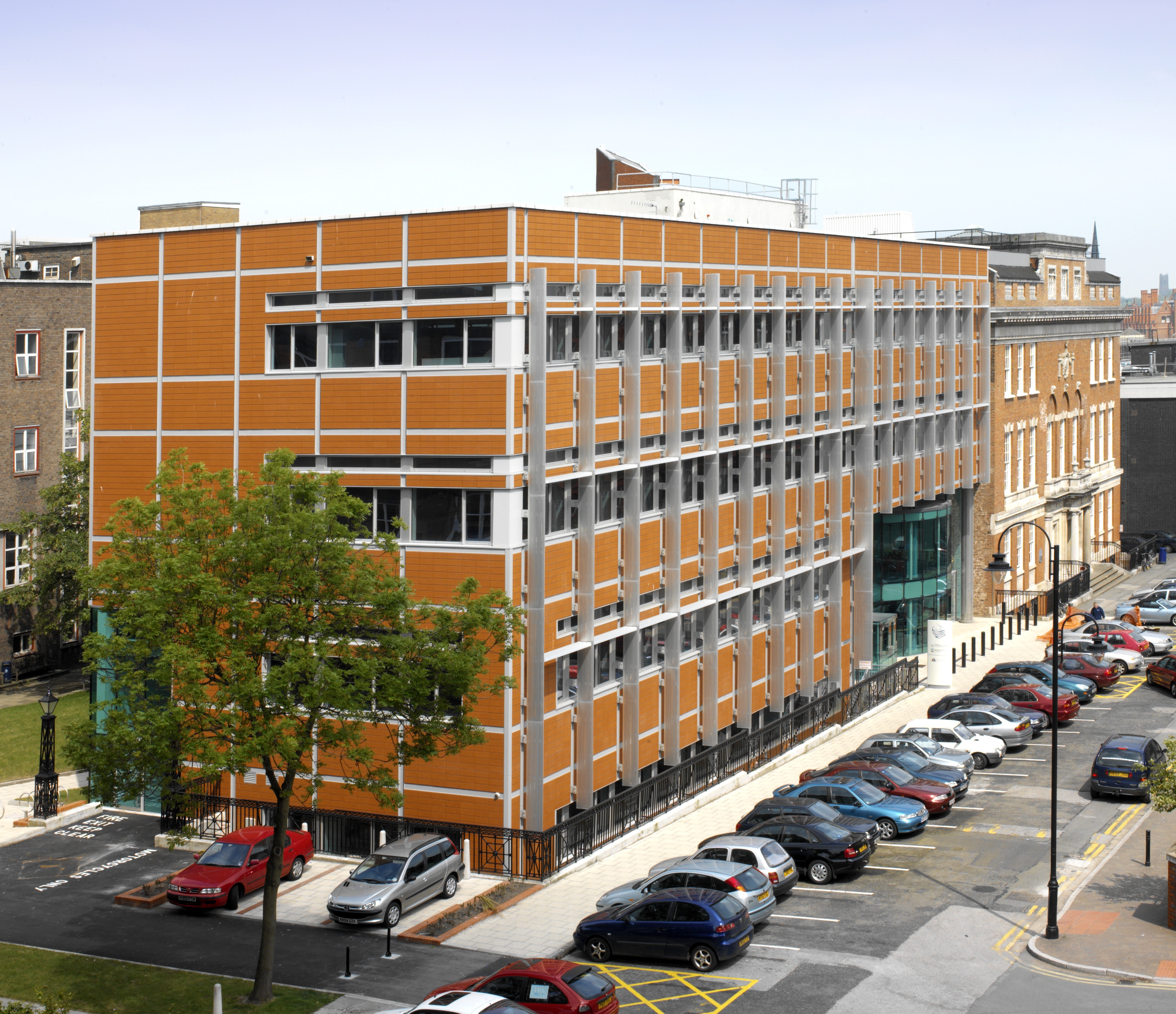
Joseph Proudman Building, home of the National Oceanography Centre, Liverpool

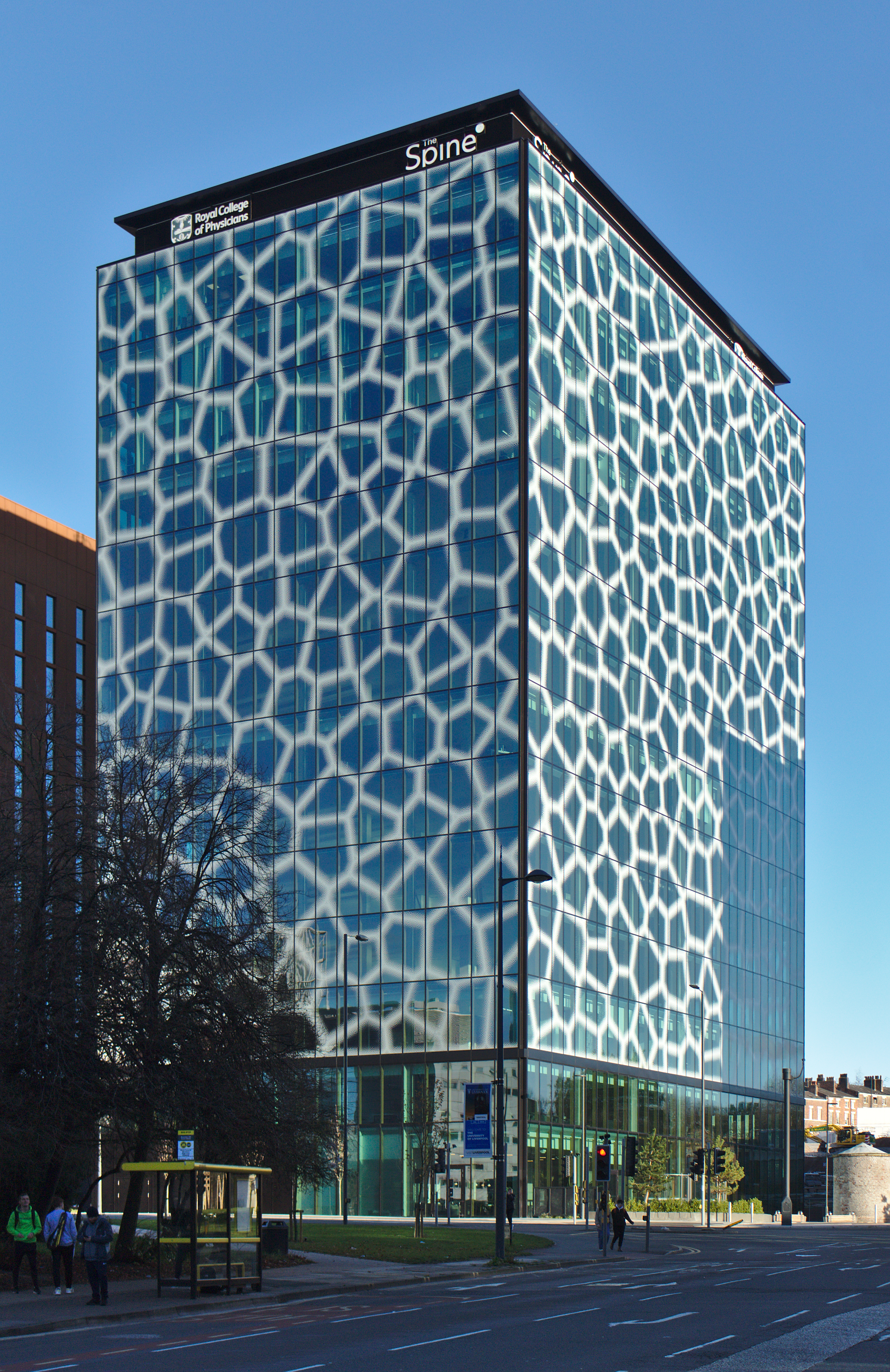
The Spine building at Paddington Village in Liverpool's Knowledge Quarter, home to the Royal College of Physicians

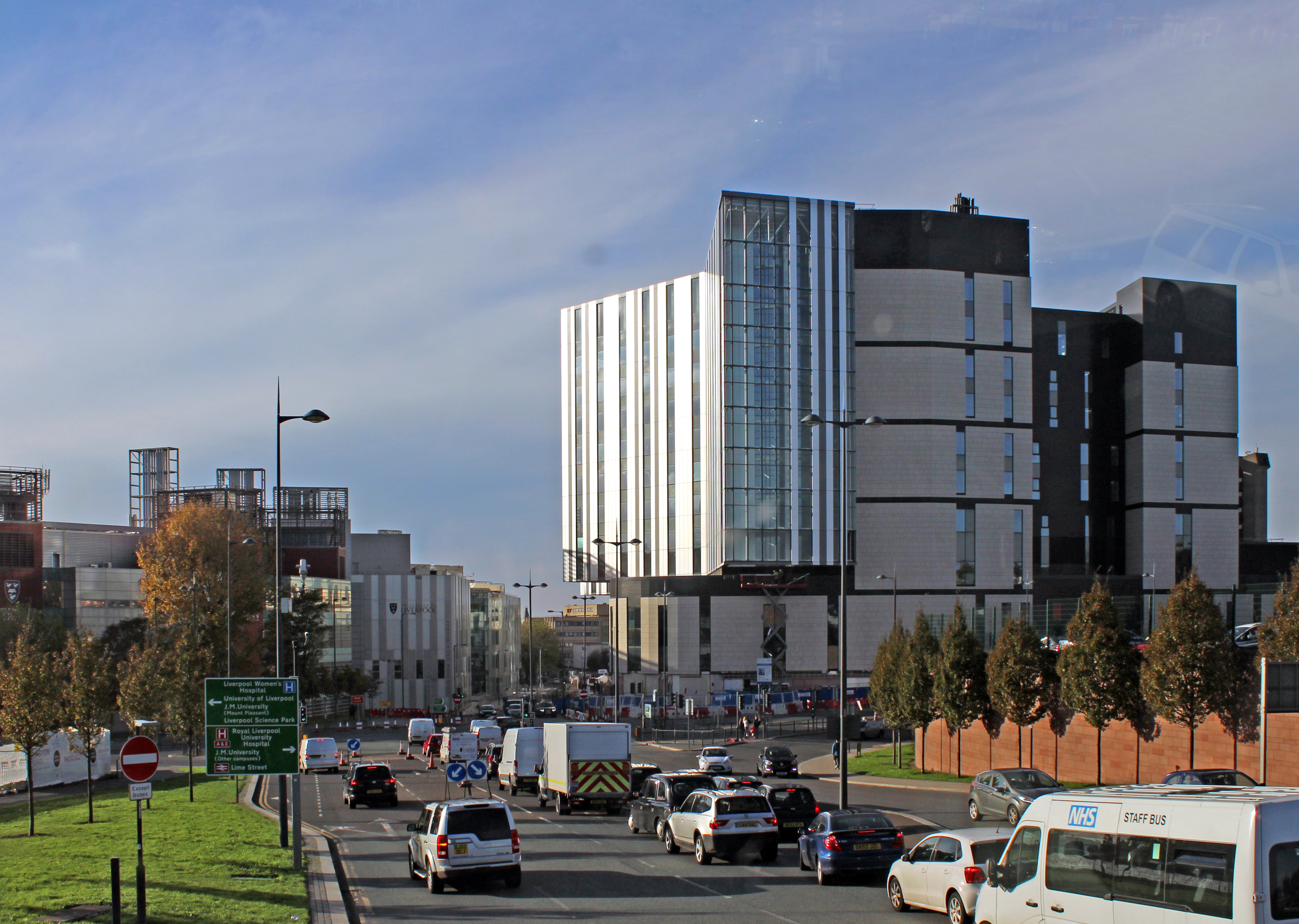
Royal Liverpool University Hospital on the right

=== National Oceanography Centre ===
The National Oceanography Centre (NOC) is located on Brownlow Street to the immediate north of Liverpool Metropolitan Cathedral. NOC is funded by UK Research and Innovation and is the UK's largest institution for integrated sea level science, coastal and deep ocean research and technology development. NOC works with government and business to conduct research in oceanography, marine physics, ocean climate, marine systems modelling, ocean bio-geosciences, ocean technology and engineering. The centre contributes to the advancement of scientific knowledge of the ocean and supports the education and training of scientists, engineers and marine professionals, as well as engaging with the public on the science of the ocean and its implications. NOC began life as the Liverpool Observatory in 1843 and since then has continued to predict tidal activity and monitor overall sea conditions.

=== Royal College of Physicians ===
Founded by a Royal Charter from King Henry VIII in 1518, the Royal College of Physicians (RCP) is the oldest medical college in England. Its northern England headquarters is based at 'The Spine' building in Paddington Village, on the edge of Liverpool's Knowledge Quarter. The RCP is a professional membership body for supporting physicians, raising standards in healthcare and promoting health in the UK and internationally. The body is also responsible for influencing the way that healthcare is designed and delivered.

=== Royal Liverpool University Hospital ===
The Royal Liverpool University Hospital is the largest hospital in the UK to provide inpatients with single en-suite bedrooms. The hospital is a national centre for eye cancer and a regional centre for pancreatic, urological, testicular, anal, and oesophago-gastric cancers, specialist palliative care, specialist radiology and specialist pathology and chemotherapy services. The hospital mainly focuses on complex planned care and specialist services. These include nephrology, renal transplantation, nuclear medicine, haematology, lithotripsy and dermatology. Liverpool University Dental Hospital is situated close to the Royal Liverpool University Hospital which supports dental teaching, provides emergency care and a range of specialist dental services including restorative dentistry, paediatric dentistry, orthodontics, oral surgery and medicine. In 2025, the demolition of the former Royal Liverpool University Hospital buildings was completed, clearing the site for the proposed Health Innovation Liverpool academic health-sciences campus. It is located close to the new hospital, that opened in 2022. In April 2026, Liverpool University Hospitals NHS Foundation Trust selected Nervecentre Software to provide an electronic patient record system for Aintree University Hospital, Broadgreen Hospital and Royal Liverpool University Hospital. The agreement is set to be 10 years long and costs £53 million. In addition, Nervecentre also opened an operations office in The Spine to support the programme.

=== Liverpool Medical Institution ===
The Liverpool Medical Institution is one of the oldest medical societies in the world, tracing its history back to 1779 when a group of local doctors created the Liverpool Medical Library. Today, the institution exists as a meeting place for the medical community to further knowledge in medicine, surgery and science. Its principle activities are maintaining a library, conducting lectures, meetings and conferences.

=== Sensor City/Central Tech ===
Sensor City opened in July 2017 as a joint venture between the University of Liverpool and Liverpool John Moores University. The facility was designed to provide offices and laboratories for businesses and organisations involved in sensor technology. The purpose-built building is clad in artwork in the form of 299 glass panels impregnated with a gold design in the theme of a printed circuit board. The building closed for refurbishment in December 2020 but remained vacant until 2025 when it reopened as Central Tech under the ownership of development company Sciontec. By September 2025, Central Tech was reported to be over two-thirds occupied after additional ventures joined the refurbished former Sensor City building.

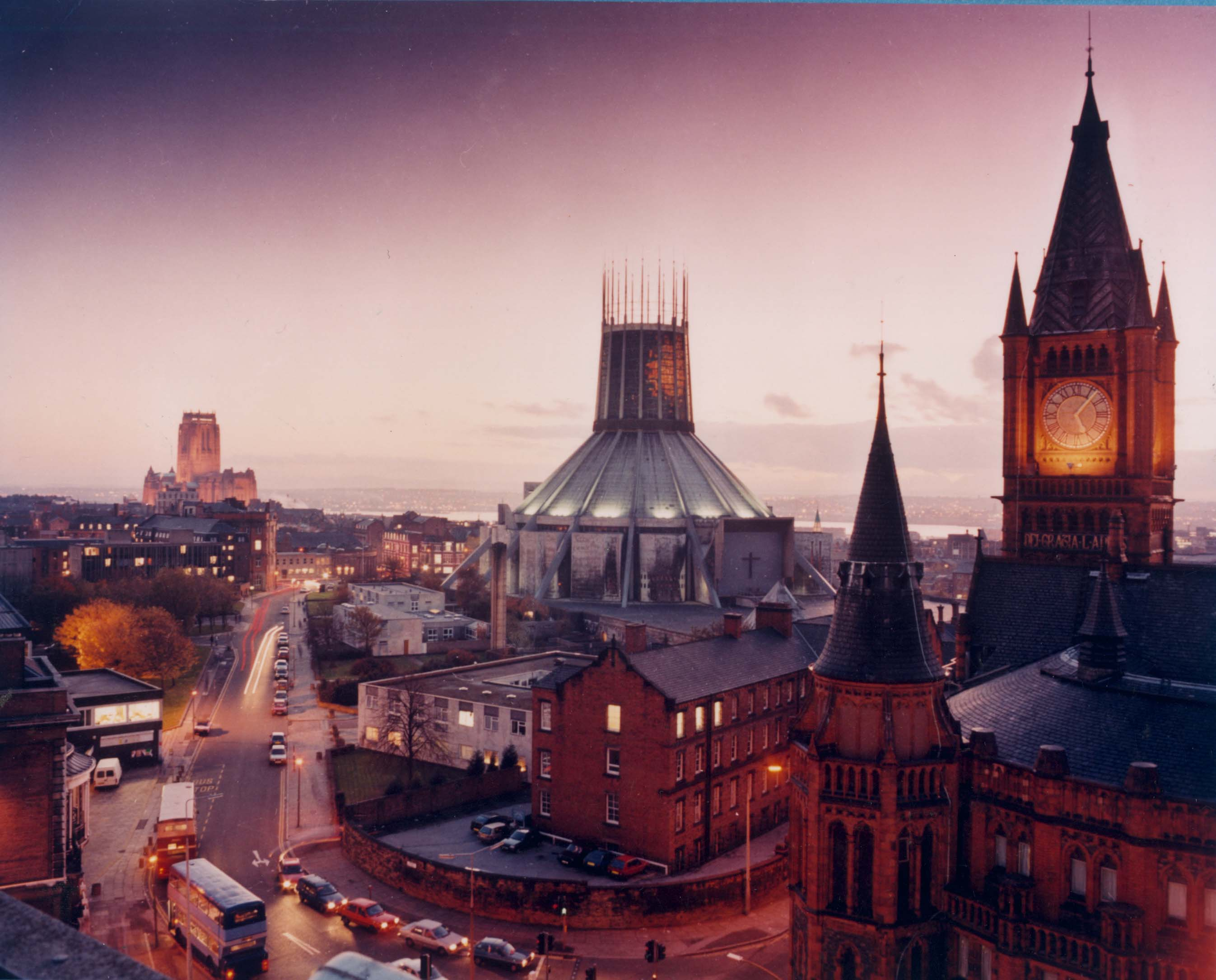
University of Liverpool campus around Brownlow Hill at dusk

=== University of Liverpool ===
The University of Liverpool is consistently ranked in the top 200 universities worldwide and is globally recognised for its research in health and life sciences, science and engineering, humanities and social sciences. It educates over 30,000 students every year, around 30% of which are overseas international students. The university was founded in 1881 as University College Liverpool and was granted university status in 1884 as part of the Victoria University. 1903 saw the institution become independent as the University of Liverpool. UoL is one of the original six 'red brick universities' and a member of the prestigious N8 and Russell Groups. The main campus is around Brownlow Hill in Liverpool's Knowledge Quarter and it also has a partner university in Suzhou, China. In 2026, the University of Liverpool completed a 2,525 m² extension to the Liverpool School of Architecture. This brought the school’s total area to 9,220 m².

== Paddington Village ==
Paddington Village is an urban village at the eastern gateway to Liverpool city centre comprising buildings dedicated to science, technology, education and health. Owned by Liverpool City Council, the area is being developed in three phases, the first of which (Paddington Central) commenced in 2017. Later phases will be named Paddington South and Paddington North. Paddington Village is currently home to Royal College of Physicians, The University of Liverpool's International College, Novotel, a multi-storey car park, as well as others. Imminent plans include a new residential development and two office buildings to be known as Hemisphere One and Hemisphere Two, with construction set to begin in 2025. By 2026, Hemisphere One was reported to be a £51.7 million redesigned life sciences building with eight storeys and approximately 150,000 square feet of laboratory and office space. Construction work is expected to take 22 months. Mayor of the Liverpool City Region Steve Rotheram has promised to improve transport to Paddington Village and the wider Knowledge Quarter, which may in the future include some form of trackless tram technology. In March 2026, Liverpool City Council and the University of Liverpool started a public consultation process for Paddington Village South, which is a later phase of the development focusing on research and progress development spaces, green spaces, and improved links along Crown Street. Furthermore, the plans include a new building for the university's chemical science department, an AI materials innovations hub and two additional commercial buildings.The project's first results are expected towards the end of 2027, and the Chemical Sciences Building is scheduled to open in 2031.

== Fabric District ==
The Fabric District forms a small part of Liverpool's Knowledge Quarter. The neighbourhood consists of 60 acres around Islington, London Road, Norton Street, Stafford Street, Kempston Street, Pembroke Place and Monument Place. The area is characterised by its growing student population and multicultural businesses. In 2025, planning officers reported that 84.5% of the 3,851 recorded accommodation units in the Fabric District were student accommodation, totalling 3,255 units.

The area has a long history of ethnic diversity. In the 19th century, the combination of a large Jewish community and mass migration from Wales, Scotland, Ireland, Russia, Poland, Italy and Germany formed a distinctive and thriving district based on fabric, fashion and the rag trade, hence its modern-day nomenclature. T. J. Hughes on London Road became one of the UK's first department stores. The area fell in to decline from the mid 20th century leading to neglected buildings, dereliction, anti-social behaviour, poor connectivity and overall poor perceptions. However, Liverpool City Council, in partnership with the Fabric District CIC (set up in 2017), has committed to a long-term regeneration strategy. The strategy will focus on physical improvements and sustaining an international, mixed-use creative community bolstered by a growing residential population. It will also concentrate on light employment, makers, manufacturing, tech based businesses, more shops and services and re-integrating the area with surrounding districts. In July 2025, Liverpool City Council approved a £3.4 million Section 106-funded public-realm programme for Monument Place and the London Road corridor, including a redesigned square, bus-priority measures and active-travel improvements.
