= David Hutchinson =

David Hutchinson may refer to:

- Dave Hutchinson (born 1960), English science fiction writer
- David Hutchinson (producer) (born 1988), British theatre producer and director
- David Hutchinson (referee), British football referee
- David Hutchinson (physicist) (born 1969), quantum physicist and professor

== See also ==
- Dave Hutchison (disambiguation)
- David Hutcheson (1905–1976), British actor
