= Dave Hutchison =

Dave Hutchison may refer to:

- Dave Hutchison (footballer) (1870–1956), Australian rules footballer
- Dave Hutchison (ice hockey) (born 1952), Canadian ice hockey player
- David Hutchison (born 1976), American football coach and player
- David E. Hutchison (born 1943), former member of the Wisconsin State Assembly
- David William Hutchison (1908–1982), general in the United States Air Force

== See also ==
- David Hutcheson (1905–1976), British actor
- David Hutchinson (disambiguation)
- David MacBrayne shipping company, originally David Hutcheson & Co.
