= The Daydream Club =

English musical duo

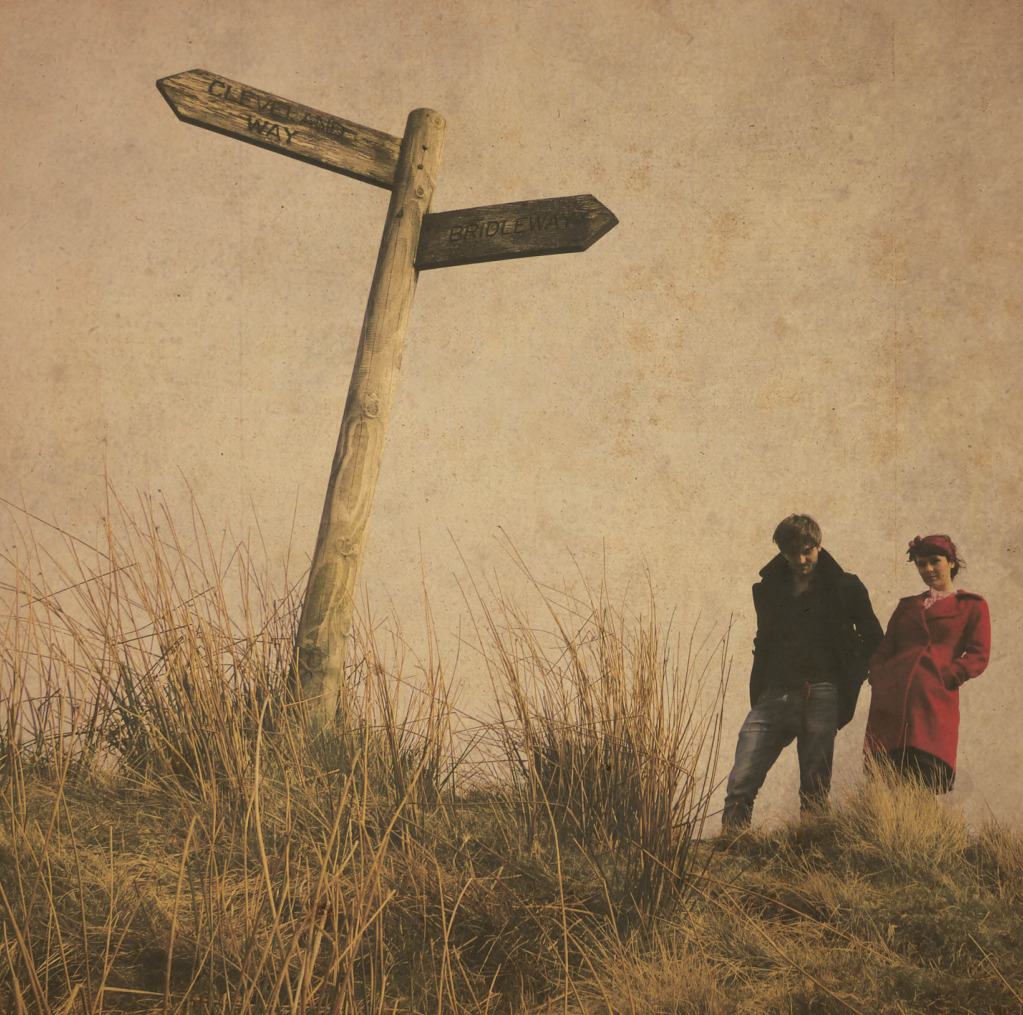
- Adam & Paula (2010)

Background information
- Origin: Leicestershire Via Redcar United Kingdom
- Genres: Folk rock, Alt-country, Indie folk, Neo-Classical, Contemporary Classical, Ambient, Electronica
- Years active: 2010–present
- Labels: Poco Poco Records
- Members: Adam Pickering; Paula Pickering (née Walker)
- Website: The Daydream Club

The Daydream Club is an English multi-genre music duo formed in 2010 by husband and wife Adam and Paula Pickering. They say their one goal is to make music they're proud of. Their manager claims they have built a strong, loyal fan base without traditional forms of financing, promotion or backing. To date all material has been self-released through their own label, Poco Poco Records. They have featured on BBC, Burberry, Acoustic Magazine, Rolling Stone, Level Films, Channel 4, the Hype Machine's most influential music blogs, and Spotify, with over 100 million streams.

== History ==
Adam Pickering began as a session musician, whilst Paula was a professional dancer. The pair first met in January 2005 on a site-specific arts project in a derelict tobacco factory in Liverpool. The project was in conjunction with the Liverpool Institute for Performing Arts (LIPA) where they both studied. Throughout their studies and after graduating they continued to collaborate on various projects and pursued careers in their respective fields. The Consequence of Sound journalist, Tony Hardy, said that "Together, they appear to have found their true milieu in The Daydream Club", which they formed in 2010.

Pickering, a multi-instrumentalist (keys, drums, guitar, bass, percussion, melodica), singer, songwriter and producer, has supported acts such as Sam Sparro, The Wombats, Sneaky Sound System, Tinchy Stryder, DJ Yoda and Felix B from Basement Jaxx.
Walker began her career as a dancer and toured internationally with the percussion show 'Noise Ensemble', headlining Henley Festival and working with Luc Petit (former Director of Cirque Du Soleil).

== Releases ==
=== Albums ===
Date	Title	Description	Ref.
2011	Overgrown	The band's first release. The track 'In The Arms of Another Day' was featured on Burberry Acoustic.	
2016	Piano Project	The 10 track improvised 'Piano Project' album was written, recorded and filmed by the duo in the space of 3 hours. The band's most successful release to date with lead single "Improv No. 10 – One Last Thought" gaining over 16 million streams on Spotify within the first year of release.	
2016	L U X	Deluxe double album including 11 original indie-folk songs and 10 electronic remixes of the same songs.	
April 2017	Ambient Project // Sound Asleep	The Daydream Club's third self-released album features classical and electronic sound as well as reversed vocals	
2018	With You In Mind	Live recordings from online concerts hosted throughout 2017. The Daydream Club invited audience members to be a part of the creative process by submitting thoughts, feelings and memories for the duo to use as inspiration for piano improvisations. Tracks include: "For the Lost Ones", "Off the Coast In Maine", "A Comet Among Stars", "My Anchor, My Home" and "I Miss Your Wonderful Face"	
2020	Piano Project // Duets	The sixth album release by The Daydream Club marks the 10th anniversary since their debut album, Overgrown. It explores the interplay between two pianists. Released in the time of the Coronavirus, Covid-19 pandemic. Recorded, produced, mixed & mastered by A. J. Pickering.	

=== Singles ===
Date	Title	B-side	Description	Ref.
16 April 2011	"The Record Shop"	"The Musician" (instrumental)	Limited edition vinyl single for Record Store Day 2011. The vinyl sleeve featured photographs of 40 independent UK record shops.	
2012	"On the Move"	Remix	The music video, directed and filmed by the band, was captured in one take and is all in reverse.	
2012	"Neon Love Song"		Christopher Bailey contacted the band requesting their participation in an upcoming ad campaign, and they were chosen as the new faces for the Spring/Summer eyewear launch alongside other British musicians including Life in Film, Marika Hackman and One Night Only. All tracks were recorded exclusively for Burberry with accompanying music videos filmed on set in London. The track secured the band features with Rolling Stone magazine, Vogue, Grazia and a number of other fashion and music editorials. The re-worked single version was mixed and mastered by Sam Bell.	
14 February 2013	"Just"		Won the London FolkFest Songwriting Award For New Creativity	
2013	"Found"		The indie-folk single "Found" featured on Burberry Acoustic.he EP is the product of a fan funding campaign whereby fans pledge money for songwriting lessons, bespoke cover versions and personalised songs from the band. As part of the campaign, every backer received a personalised thank you dedication picture. Some of these pictures make up the artwork for an EP, consisting of a remix produced by the band.	
2015	"Saltwater"	Remix	The music video includes a surprise marriage proposal from Adam Pickering to Paula Walker	
2016	"Improv No. 10 – One Last Thought"		Gained over 16 million streams on Spotify within the first year of release.	
2016	"A Christmas Music Box"		As featured in the film 'Harrods and Burberry Present A Very British Fairy Tale' 2016. The project had three elements: a film, a Harrods window display and an interactive social media app with a personalised melody and video unique to users initials	
2018	"For the Lost Ones"		The Daydream Club hosted a series of live-streamed performances in 2017, inviting audience members worldwide to submit their own thoughts, feelings and memories, which they turned into live spontaneous piano improvisations. (see Albums, With You in Mind) "Piano Project // For the Lost Ones" was the product of a request by a fan the day after a London terror attack in 2017, the dedication "in memory of anyone affected by the recent terror attacks anywhere in the world".	
2018	"Off the Coast In Maine"		The second single from With You in Mind.	
2018	"A Comet Among Stars"		The third single from With You in Mind.	
2018	"My Anchor, My Home"		The fourth single from With You in Mind.	
2018	"I Miss Your Wonderful Face"		The fifth and last single from With You in Mind.	
2019	"Always On My Mind"		The first of The Daydream Club's new approach to releasing music, opting to write and record multiple albums simultaneously, releasing singles as they are finished rather than waiting for an entire album of work. The band said "This approach will make creation more fun for us and releases more frequent and diverse for fans." Recorded, produced, mixed & mastered by A. J. Pickering.	
2019	"Wolf Winter"		Duet for two pianos. Recorded, produced, mixed & mastered by A. J. Pickering	
2020	"Heavy Hearted"		The second single from the duo's Piano Project, which focused solely on piano duets. Recorded, produced, mixed & mastered by A. J. Pickering	
