= Liverpool Institute for Performing Arts =

Performing arts school set up by Paul McCartney in Liverpool, England

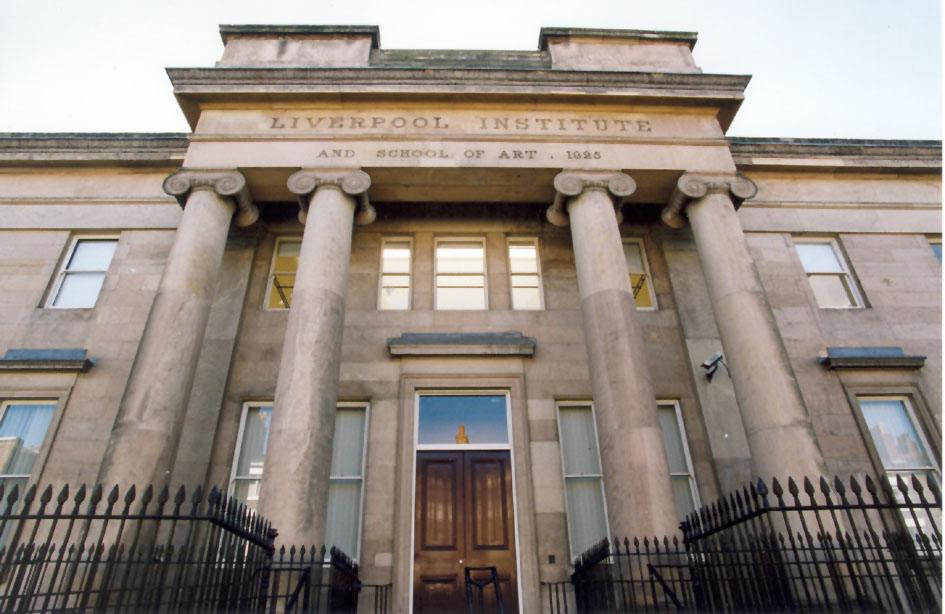
- LIPA's main entrance, on Mount Street
- Established: 7 June 1996
- Founders: Paul McCartney; Mark Featherstone-Witty
- Affiliations: Federation of Drama Schools
- Location: Liverpool, England; 53°23′58.4″N 2°58′20.3″W
- Campus: Urban
- Website: www.lipa.ac.uk
- Building details

General information
- Construction started: 1990

Design and construction
- Architect: David Watkins – Brock Carmichael Architects

The Liverpool Institute for Performing Arts (LIPA) is a performing arts higher education institution in Liverpool, founded by Paul McCartney and Mark Featherstone-Witty and opened in 1996. It is a member of the Federation of Drama Schools.

The Education Guardian has previously ranked LIPA No. 1 in the UK for several of its degree courses, and it is regularly ranked as one of the top 10 specialist institutions.

In September 2003, LIPA launched LIPA 4–19, a part-time performing arts academy for 4-to-19-year-olds. LIPA established a primary free school in 2014 and a sixth form free college in 2016, both of which are due to shut on 22 July 2026.

== History ==
=== Formation ===
LIPA was founded by Paul McCartney and Mark Featherstone-Witty. McCartney had known since 1985 that the building which had housed his old school, the Liverpool Institute High School for Boys, was becoming increasingly derelict after the school's closure and wished to find a productive use for it; Featherstone-Witty had set up the Brit School in London and was looking for an opportunity to open another school. McCartney and Featherstone-Witty were introduced to each other by record producer George Martin. The process of setting up the facility and the school took seven years and cost £20m.

=== 1996–today ===
LIPA was opened by Queen Elizabeth II on 7 June 1996, and marked its 10th birthday in January 2006 with a performance at the Liverpool Philharmonic Hall and a new book, LIPA – The First Ten Years in Pictures, written by Featherstone-Witty.

LIPA was designated as a higher education institution (HEI) in 2006. As a performing arts HEI, LIPA is attended by the highest number of international students in the UK. LIPA has been awarded the Gold Standard from Investors in People – the only HEI to have achieved this level in the UK. LIPA also has the highest concentration of Fellows and Associates recognised by the Higher Education Academy.

In March 2012, LIPA announced that it had purchased the former building of the Liverpool College of Art for £3.7 million, to expand its teaching accommodation. Building work started on the Art School in 2014, and was completed in August 2016.

Featherstone-Witty resigned as LIPA secretary in March 2015.

In November 2025, LIPA announced it had secured a £2.5 million office to be turned into a new performance and digital innovation hub, scheduled to open in Spring 2026.

=== Schools ===
Under the Free School programme, LIPA opened a primary school nearby in 2014, and a Sixth Form College in September 2016. The school is due to close in August 2026.

== Academics ==
LIPA offers 20 full-time BA (Hons) degrees in a range of fields across the performing arts, as well as three Foundation Certificate programmes of study in acting and popular music. LIPA offers full-time, one-year master's-level degree courses in Acting and Costume Design and Making.

A 2017 survey of students who graduated in 2014 showed that 91% were in work, and 83% of those were working in the performing arts.

== Companions ==
LIPA does not issue its own degrees, so rather than issuing Honorary degrees like other British universities, it awards "Companionships" to individuals in recognition of their contributions to the world of art and entertainment. Prospective companions often visit LIPA to give masterclasses to students, or to participate in question and answer sessions.

Companionships awarded by the institution are:

- 2001: Joan Armatrading +; Benny Gallagher; Malcolm McLaren
- 2002: Stephen Bayley; Anthony Field; Thelma Holt; Tony Wilson
- 2003: Barbara Dickson; Anthony Everitt; Nickolas Grace; Andy McCluskey
- 2004: The Bangles; Ken Campbell (actor); Tim Firth; Terry Marshall; Arlene Phillips; Willy Russell; Jon Webster
- 2005: Guy Chambers; Robin Gibb; Alec McCowen; Tim Wheeler
- 2006: Lynda Bellingham; Sir Ken Robinson; Jörg Sennheiser; Terence Stamp; David Stark
- 2007: Anita Dobson; Alan McGee; David Pugh; Ralph Koltai; Steve Levine; Ben Elton
- 2008: John Hurt; Trevor Horn; Cathy Dennis; Ann Harrison; Nitin Sawhney; Lea Anderson
- 2009: Will Young; Joe McGann; Pippa Ailion; John Fox; Richard Hudson; Natricia Bernard; Tony Platt
- 2010: Alan Moulder; LaVelle Smith Jnr; Dave Pammenter; Christopher Oram; Jonathan Pryce; Heather Knight; Midge Ure; Mark Summers was also presented as an Honoured Friend.
- 2011: Colin Eccleston; David Bell; Paule Constable; Caroline Elleray; Chris Johnson; Steve Nestar; Billy Ocean; Hannah Waddingham; Spencer Leigh was also presented as an Honoured Friend.
- 2012: Matthew Bourne; Pam Schweitzer; Kevin Godley; Gary lloyd; Michael Harrison; Jason Barnes; Owen Lewis; Victor Greenberg was also presented as an Honoured Friend
- 2013: Keith Johnstone; Mark Ronson; Stephen Mear; Xenon Schoepe; Andy Hayles; Seymour Stein; Rowena Morgan was also presented as an Honoured Friend
- 2014: Don Black; Samuel West; Adrian Jackson; Nick Starr; Colin Richmond; Patrick Woodroffe; Briony Albert; Giles Martin. Janice Long and Suzahn Fiering were presented as Honoured Friends.
- 2015: Gemma Bodinetz; Fran Healy; Noddy Holder; Conor Murphy; Hugh Padgham; Scott Rodger; James Thompson; Sharon Watson. John T Rago was also presented as an Honoured Friend
- 2016: Martin Levan; Tim Prentki; David Babani; Darren Henley; Christopher Manoe; Alan Lane; Christopher Shutt; Tom Robinson. Tetsuo Hamada; Paul Whiting were also presented as honoured friends
- 2017: Woody Harrelson; Chris Difford; John Caird; Jon Burton; Kay Hilton; Jo Collins; Mary Ward; Jon Driscoll. Tony Wood was also presented as an honoured friend.
- 2018: Toyah Willcox; Nile Rodgers; John Leonard; Paul Burger; Ali Campbell; Felice Ross; Dean Lee.
- 2019: Stephen Fry; Rowan Atkinson; Mike Batt; Lucy Carter; Sue Gill; Steve Lewis; Tom Pye; Kenrick Sandy; Andrew Scheps. Cliff Cooper was made an Honoured Friend of LIPA.

+ denotes a Companion who is also a LIPA Patron.

== Notable alumni ==
- Leanne Best, film and television actress
- Alyssa Bonagura (2009) American singer/songwriter
- Gabrielle Brooks, actress
- Jan Burton, music producer
- Peter Caulfield, actor
- Circa Waves, indie rock band (Joe Falconer, Sam Rourke)
- Clean Cut Kid, indie pop band
- Crawlers, indie rock band
- Dan Croll, singer-songwriter
- Mike Crossey, music producer and mix engineer
- Douglas Dare, singer-songwriter
- The Daydream Club, music duo
- Mark Franks, singer in The Overtones
- Fickle Friends, indie pop band (Natassja Shiner, Sam Morris)
- Mads Hauge, songwriter and producer
- Kate Havnevik, Norwegian singer-songwriter
- Her's, indie rock duo
- Dag Holtan-Hartwig, Norwegian singer-songwriter
- Lynette Howell Taylor, producer A Star Is Born (2018 film)
- Holly Humberstone, singer-songwriter
- David Hutchinson, founder and Artistic Director of Selladoor Worldwide
- Christian Ingebrigtsen, Norwegian singer-songwriter and musician (A1)
- Seun Kuti, Afrobeat musician
- Rachel Leskovac, actress
- Jamie Lloyd, director
- Jon Lolis, actor (Hollyoaks)
- Liam Lynch, US-based singer, writer & director
- Eugene McGuinness, singer/songwriter signed to Domino records.
- Theo Nate, actor
- Jalen Ngonda, American musician
- Dawn O'Porter, writer, director and TV presenter
- Mikhael Paskalev, Norwegian singer-songwriter
- Hannah Peel, artist, producer, composer
- Pixey band members
- Connor Ratliff, American comedian and actor
- Jessica Reynolds, actress
- The Staves, folk trio (Jessica Staveley-Taylor)
- Iselin Solheim, Norwegian singer and songwriter
- Stealing Sheep, folk band (Rebecca Hawley)
- St. Lucia (musician), indie pop band (Jean-Philip Grobler, Patti Beranek)
- Lisa Stokke, Norwegian singer and actress
- Sandi Thom, Scottish singer-songwriter
- Liz White, actress (Life on Mars)
- The Wombats, indie rock trio

== See also ==
- Liverpool Knowledge Quarter
- Liverpool Institute High School for Boys
