= Selladoor Worldwide =

Theatre company in the United Kingdom

- Address: 1 Creek Road, London; Greenwich; England

Construction
- Opened: 2008

Website
- www.selladoor.com

Selladoor Worldwide is a UK Theatre producing company based in Greenwich, London. Selladoor Worldwide produce musical theatre, plays and family theatre for UK and international touring and the West End. Selladoor Worldwide also operate and manage theatres across the UK, known as Selladoor Venues.

== History ==
Selladoor Worldwide was formed in 2009 by David Hutchinson and Phillip Rowntree, whilst students at The Liverpool Institute for Performing Arts. Phillip departed from Selladoor Worldwide in 2020, and David Hutchinson remained as CEO. In 2022, it was announced that Andrew Shepherd would take over as executive director and Lucy Atkinson was brought in, in 2023 as the new Creative Producer.

In 2024 a senior leadership change saw Sarah Crompton-Howes come on board as Executive Producer taking over from both Andrew and Lucy, supported by Alex Neidert as Finance & Operations Director.

The company's début production, The Secrets Inside, was written by Hutchinson and directed by Richard Adams. It premiered at the 2008 Edinburgh Fringe Festival, then ran at the Tolbooth in Stirling. Selladoor soon moved into producing regional touring theatre, starting with a national tour of Liz Lochhead's adaptation of Dracula in 2010. The following year, it conducted the first British tour of Spring Awakening, which visited Exeter, Stirling, Edinburgh, Manchester, London and Norwich; and produced the centenary tour of William Golding's Lord of the Flies, across Scotland, England and Wales.

In 2011, Selladoor also started producing an annual Off West End season at the Greenwich Theatre. In November 2013, Selladoor was made an official partner company at the Greenwich Theatre. The 2014 season included Avenue Q and adaptations of the novels Kidnapped and Alice in Wonderland.

In 2012, Sell a Door and Boxed Cat Theatre produced Rainbow, written and directed by Emily Jenkins, at Zoo Southside during the Edinburgh Festival Fringe. The production received a Scotsman Fringe First Award.

Selladoor's head office moved to London in 2009, at Athenley House on Greenwich High Road and subsequently to the Deptford Mission in Deptford. In 2012, they were made a resident producing company at the Beacon Arts Centre in Greenock, which opened in January 2015.

In December 2012, Selladoor made their West End debut with a production of Seussical, written by Stephen Flaherty and Lynn Ahrens, at the Arts Theatre. Recent shows include the London revival of Alan Bennett's The History Boys and Tim Kelly's adaptation of The Hound of the Baskervilles.

In 2013, Sell a Door Theatre Company partnered with the Greenwich Theatre following nine productions at the South London venue. James Haddrell and David officially announced the partnership on 19 November ahead of Sell a Door Theatre Company opening their second West End production of Seussical.

In 2014, Sell A Door Theatre Company produced their first UK Tour of the popular musical Avenue Q. Due to the demand and success from their production it completed another UK Tour throughout 2015 and 2016.

In 2015, David Hutchinson directed the world premiere of Jo Clifford's Jekyll and Hyde based on Robert Louis Stevenson's gothic classic at the Greenwich Theatre followed by a thirty-three venue tour across the UK.

In 2016, Sell A Door Theatre Company continued to expand in size, borders and targets, rebranding the company to Selladoor Worldwide.

In 2017, Selladoor produced UK Tours of Footloose, Flashdance The Musical, Spamalot, and The Crucible, and produced their first International Tours, Jersey Boys and The Producers. Collectively in 2017 Selladoor Worldwide's productions performed in 8 different countries.

2017 also saw Selladoor Worldwide opened an international offices in Bangkok. David saw great potential in the Bangkok's developing cultural market, and explained that he wants "to be in there first and develop those relationships." Therefore, David opened the Asia Pacific office located in Bangkok, which is managed by Peevara Kitchumnongpan

Selladoor Creation was launched in 2018, a platform for new writers to showcase and develop their work and bring innovative new work to the national and international stage, making it accessible for all audiences.

In 2018 Selladoor produced John Steinbeck's classic Of Mice and Men in association with the Marlowe Theatre in Canterbury and collaborated with the Queen's Theatre Hornchurch and Les Theatre De La Villa De Luxembourg for a limited run of Diane Samuel's Kindertransport, marking 25 years since its debut at the Cockpit Theatre in London. Flashdance The Musical continued to tour the UK throughout 2018 as well visiting international venues such as Zurich MAAG and Kursaal Oostende. In the summer Selladoor launched two new exhilarating productions, Madagascar The Musical and Fame the 30th Anniversary UK tour. The Christmas season saw Selladoor's first pantomime of Aladdin at The Broadway Theatre, Catford, along with their Christmas show of The Wizard of Oz starring Holly Tandy at the Blackpool Winter Gardens.

In 2019 American Idiot was revived for a 10th Anniversary Tour, and Avenue Q embarked on its 3rd UK Tour. Selladoor co-produced 9 to 5 the musical with ATG and Dolly Parton at the Savoy Theatre, London. Selladoor Worldwide also produced the London premiere of Falsettos at The Other Palace, alongside UK tours of Amelie The Musical and Little Miss Sunshine the Musical, Elmer The Patchwork Elephant Show and The Mr. Men & Little Miss on Stage.

In 2020 Selladoor announced the UK tours of Footloose The Musical and Bring It On the Musical and international tours of We Will Rock You and 9 to 5 the Musical, however due to COVID-19 all productions have been postponed to 2021.

In 2021, Selladoor produced the stage version of the 2001 whimsical, romantic comedy of the same name, "Amélie". The plot centres around a young woman who lives quietly in the world, but loudly in her head.

In 2022, Selladoor produced Footloose The Musical tour taking it on the road to Switzerland before returning for a UK run with stars Darren Day and Jake Quickenden.

2022, also brought in the Broadway musical, "Bring It On", based on the 2000 American, teenage, cheer comedy. Starting its tour at the Peterborough New Theatre before ending at The Southbank Centre; the show starred Olympic Gymnast Louis Smith and Love Island star, Amber Davies.

In 2023, Madagascar The Musical, in partnership with DreamWorks (Shrek the Musical) began its tour of Australia before returning to the UK in October 2023. The first touring production with Selladoor premiered in 2018.

After taking over the general management role from The Path Entertainment Group, "The SpongeBob Musical" based on the beloved series written by Stephen Hillenburg and the book written by Kyle Jarrow which had made a splash with audiences all over the world, began its UK based tour with Selladoor in 2023 starring RuPaul's Drag Race UK star, Divina de Campo and Pop Idol star, Gareth Gates.

== Venues ==
In 2021 the Selladoor venues of Queen's Theatre Barnstaple, The Landmark Theatre, Ilfracombe; and Peterborough New Theatre were brought together to become a separate entity, away from Selladoor Worldwide. They were successfully launched as a new non for profit entity and began operating in 2022 before being officially named Landmark Theatres in May 2023. The Theatre was officially opened by Sir Ian McKellen with the premiere of his one-man show, Tolkien, Shakespeare and You!

Selladoor Worldwide also have offices in Madrid and Bangkok in addition to their headquarters in London. 2019 saw the expansion of the Selladoor Worldwide group, with the announcement of Selladoor Venues. Selladoor Venues are the current operators for The Landmark Theatres.

Name	Location	Year
New Theatre	Peterborough	September 2019
Queen's Theatre	Barnstaple	January 2019
The Landmark	Ilfracombe	January 2019
The Key Theatre	Peterborough	January 2019

== International Offices ==
Name	City	Country	Year opened
Selladoor Worldwide	London	United Kingdom	2009
Selladoor Asia Pacific	Bangkok	Thailand	2018
