= David Hutchinson (producer) =

British theatre producer and director

David Hutchinson (born 28 May 1988) is a British theatre producer and director. He is the founder and CEO of The Path Entertainment Group as well as the founder and CEO of Selladoor Worldwide, formerly Sell a Door Theatre Company Hutchinson attended the Liverpool Institute for Performing Arts 2006 to 2009 and graduated with a BA (Hons) in Acting.

In August 2021, The Path Entertainment Group and Hasbro launched the first immersive, multifaceted, physical experience of Monopoly Lifesized based on the family board game. The 80-minute game comprises elements from the classic game merged with thrilling escape room challenges. Based in London, the experience is also home to The Top Hat Restaurant and Bar serving signature cocktails and British small-plates menu. The game has won awards and nominations for live and location based entertainment and opened a brand new location in Riyadh, Saudi Arabia.

In May 2021, David founded The Path Entertainment Group, an immersive entertainment company. The company was awarded the 2022 Best Location-Based Entertainment Award for their work producing the interactive version of the classic Hasbro board game, Monopoly Lifesized. Though GamePath, a subsection of The Path Entertainment Group that creates experimental productions with leading brands, David produced London's first official Saw escape room experience with Lionsgate.

In 2023 The Path Entertainment Group launched The Paddington Bear Experience, a large-scale immersive production inspired by Michael Bond's book series. The production, located at County Hall in South Bank, is London's first large-scale attraction inspired by Paddington Bear.

David Hutchinson created Selladoor Theatre Company in 2009 after graduating from Liverpool Institute for Performing Arts. The company began touring to small venues and producing for fringe festivals, and within less than 10 years, David Hutchinson was producing UK tours at mid- and large-scale venues, international tours across four continents, and West End productions. David Hutchinson is now the CEO of Selladoor Worldwide and his portfolio of productions includes 9 to 5 The Musical (Savoy Theatre, London), Falsettos (The Other Palace, London), Flashdance The Musical (UK & International tours), Madagascar: A Musical Adventure (UK & International tours), Jersey Boys (International Tour), The Producers (International Tour), Avenue Q (UK Tours), Amelie The Musical (UK Tour & The Other Palace), Of Mice And Men (UK Tour), Elmer The Patchwork Elephant Show (UK & International Tours). A full list Selladoor's productions are detailed in the Credits section.

In addition to producing, David Hutchinson expanded the company in 2019 launching Selladoor Venues, becoming the theatre operator for Queen's Theatre Barnstaple, The Landmark Theatre, Ilfracombe; and Peterborough New Theatre. In 2021 the venues were brought together to become a separate entity, away from Selladoor Worldwide. They were successfully launched as a new non for profit entity and began operating in 2022 before being officially named Landmark Theatres in May 2023. Sir Ian McKellen opened the Ilfracombe Theatre to perform his one-man show "Tolkien, Shakespeare and You!" in March 2019.

In 2020 David Hutchinson announced the launch of a brand new company dedicate to developing and staging large-scale experiential and live gameplay productions, Gamepath. Gamepath launched in partnership with leading global entertainment brands, alongside the announcement of Monopoly Lifesized, in collaboration with Hasbro, as well as other major iconic titles across the gaming and cinematic genres in creation.

David is also the co-founder of We Are I Am, alongside Louis Hartshorn, a marketing company that provides specialist marketing, press and communications support to the arts sector.

David is a notable campaigner for strengthening international relations in response to the challenges that Brexit brings to the theatre industry, and advocated for support from the Government to support the Arts during the COVID-19 pandemic.

David sat on the board of the New Wolsey Theatre, Ipswich from 2016 until his departure in 2021 and is currently the associate director of the Brooklyn Youth Company in New York City.

== Theatrical career ==
In 2010 he directed the UK tour of Dracula at twelve venues across Scotland, and in 2012 directed a co-production between Sell a Door Theatre Company and Mull Theatre of Arthur Miller's The Man Who Had All the Luck which toured across Scotland and London.

Hutchinson produced the debut UK Tour of Spring Awakening the Musical touring to the Exeter Northcott Theatre, Manchester The Lowry, Stirling MacRobert Arts Centre, Greenwich Theatre and Norwich Playhouse. He produced the debut West End production of Seussical at the Arts Theatre, London in December 2012. He went on to produce the 2014 tour of Avenue Q touring 32 venues in the UK, Ireland and Hong Kong

David first produced the Scotsman Fringe First award-winning play Rainbow at the Edinburgh Fringe Festival in 2012.

In 2013, David Hutchinson partnered Sell a Door Theatre Company with the Greenwich Theatre following nine productions at the South London venue. James Haddrell and David officially announced the partnership on 19 November ahead of Sell a Door Theatre Company opening their second West End production of Seussical.

In 2014, as Sell A Door Theatre Company, David produced their first UK Tour of the popular musical Avenue Q. Due to the demand and success from their production it completed another UK Tour throughout 2015 and 2016.

In 2015, David Hutchinson directed the world premiere of Jo Clifford's Jekyll and Hyde based on Robert Louis Stevenson's gothic classic at the Greenwich Theatre followed by a thirty-three venue tour across the UK.

In 2016 David Hutchinson continued to expand the company in size, borders and targets, rebranding the company to Selladoor Worldwide. Sell A Door Theatre Company had established themselves as an integral part of the regional theatre landscape in the UK and Ireland, but Hutchinson aspired to expand further afield and therefore to produce and tour theatre not only in the UK, but worldwide.

Along with UK Tours of Footloose, Flashdance The Musical, Spamalot, and The Crucible, David Hutchinson, as Selladoor Worldwide produced their first International Tours in 2017, including Jersey Boys and The Producers. Collectively in 2017 Selladoor Worldwide's productions performed in 8 different countries.

2018 began with the opening of the UK tour of Of Mice And Men in association with the Marlowe Theatre in Canterbury. The second play produced in 2018 was Diane Samuel's Kindertransport in collaboration with the Queen's Theatre Hornchurch and Les Theatre De La Villa De Luxembourg. Flashdance The Musical continued to tour the UK throughout 2018 as well visiting international venues such as Zurich MAAG and Kursaal Oostende. Notably, in the summer of 2018 Selladoor launched two new productions, Madagascar The Musical and Fame the 30th Anniversary UK tour, as well as co-producing the musical, Rock of Ages with DLAP. During the Christmas season Selladoor produced The Wizard of Oz Christmas show in Blackpool and Aladdin pantomime at The Broadway Theatre, Catford.

In 2018, David Hutchinson launched Selladoor Creation, a platform for new writers to showcase and develop their work and bring innovative new work to the national and international stage, making it accessible for all audiences.

In 2019 American Idiot was revived for a 10th Anniversary Tour, and Avenue Q embarked on its 3rd UK Tour. David Hutchinson co-produced 9 to 5 the musical with ATG and Dolly Parton at the Savoy Theatre, London. David Hutchinson as Selladoor Worldwide also produced the London premiere of Falsettos at The Other Palace, alongside UK tours of Amelie The Musical and Little Miss Sunshine the Musical, Elmer The Patchwork Elephant Show and The Mr. Men & Little Miss on Stage. In 2019 David Hutchinson became a theatre operator, launching Selladoor Venues, which includes the Queen's Theatre, Barnstaple; The Landmark Theatre, Ilfracombe; and Peterborough New Theatre

In 2020 Selladoor announced the UK tours of Footloose The Musical and Bring It On the Musical and international tours of We Will Rock You and 9 to 5 the Musical, however due to COVID-19 all productions have been postponed to 2021.

In 2021, Selladoor produced the stage version of the 2001 whimsical, romantic comedy of the same name, "Amélie". The plot centres around a young woman who lives quietly in the world, but loudly in her head.

2022, brought in the Broadway musical, "Bring It On", based on the 2000 American, teenage, cheer comedy. Starting its tour at the Peterborough New Theatre before ending at The Southbank Centre; the show starred Olympic Gymnast Louis Smith.

In 2023, Madagascar The Musical, in partnership with DreamWorks (Shrek the Musical) is currently touring Australia before going on to tour the UK with the first show in Plymouth in October 2023.the first production with Selladoor premiered in 2018.

"The SpongeBob Musical" based on the beloved series written by Stephen Hillenburg and the book written by Kyle Jarrow made a splash with audiences all over the world, began its UK based tour in 2023 starring RuPaul's Drag Race UK star, Divina de Campo and Pop Idol star, Gareth Gates.

== International expansion ==
David travels internationally regularly to explore new performance opportunities and business ventures, annually attending conferences such as SPAF (China) and APAP (New York). This has enabled numerous Selladoor productions to perform outside of the UK, to territories such as Switzerland, Germany, Belgium, Turkey, China, Malaysia, New Zealand, UAE.

The level of international touring significantly increased for Selladoor Worldwide, with a particular focus in Asia. Therefore, in 2017 David Hutchinson opened an international office in Bangkok, as Selladoor Asia Pacific, which is managed by Peevara Kitchumnongpan.

Continuing to open doors to the world to help make theatre accessible across the globe, David opened the Selladoor Spain office in Madrid in 2019, with Juan Carlos Orihuela, opening with the transfer of Flashdance The Musical at the Apollo Theatre, Madrid. David saw the opportunity of having a mainland European hub, especially in light of Brexit, to enable Selladoor to continue to maintain strong ties with the continent.

== Attraction Experiences ==
Name	Location	Year
Monopoly Lifesized	London	August 2021
SAW: The Experience	London	October 2022
Monopoly Lifesized	Riyadh	December 2022
The Paddington Bear Experience	London	December 2023

== Notable events ==
- 2009 – Sell A Door Theatre Company was created
- 2011 – Associate Director of the Brooklyn Youth Company in New York City
- 2013 – Partnership with Greenwich Theatre
- 2016 – Selladoor Worldwide was established
- 2016 – Launched Greenwich Young Writers Group
- 2016 – Co-founded We Are I AM (previously I AM Marketing)
- 2017 – Produced first International Tours – Jersey Boys & The Producers
- 2017 – First production to open in North America
- 2018 – Asia Pacific office opened
- 2018 – Nominated for the Tourism and Culture Awards at Greenwich Business Awards
- 2019 – Launch of Selladoor Venues, including Queen's Theatre Barnstaple, The Landmark Ilfracombe, Peterborough New Theatre
- 2019 – Madrid office opened with the productiong of Flashdance The Musical
- 2020 – Awarded The Stage's International Award
- 2020 – Launch of Gamepath, a new company dedicated to experimental & live gameplay

== Commissions ==
- A Foreign Field – In development

An adaptation of Ben Macintyre's Novel ‘A Foreign Field’ – An extraordinary story of love, duplicity and shame.
Book written by Ludovic-Alexandre Vidal and Music written by Julien Salvia

- Guess How Much I Love You – 2017/18

By Sam McBratney, Adapted by Anna Fox
In early 2017 it performed at Greenwich Theatre and Portsmouth King's Theatre before touring to the Middle East in Spring. Culminating with an extended run at the Arts Theatre in London at the end of 2017. In 2018 Guess How Much I Love You goes on to enjoy a Far East tour along with a larger tour of the UK.

- The Quite Remarkable Adventures of the Owl and the Pussycat – 2017

Adapted from the Eric Idle book, by Dougal Irvine
Coventry, Belgrade Theatre

- The Broons – 2016

Adapted by Rob Drummond (The Broons)
10 venue Scottish Tour, venues included Edinburgh Kings, Glasgow Theatre Royal, and Aberdeen His Majesty's Theatre

- The Silver Sword – 2015

By Ian Serraillier, Adapted by Susie McKenna and Steven Edis
8 venue UK Tour

- Jekyll and Hyde – 2015

By Robert Louis Stevenson, Adapted by Jo Clifford
31 venue UK Tour

- Alice in Wonderland – 2014

By Lewis Carroll, Adapted by the company
Greenwich Theatre

- Kidnapped – 2014

By Robert Louis Stevenson, Adapted by Ivan Wilkinson
36 venue tour, including Greenwich Theatre and opened at Sell A Door Theatre's Scottish home, The Beacon Arts Centre in Greenock.

- Sincerely Mr Toad, based on the life of Kenneth Grahame – 2013

Book by David Hutchinson, Lyrics by Katy McIvor and Music and Lyrics by David Wilson
5 venue UK tour, including performances at Greenwich Theatre and Edinburgh Festival

- Six Ways, a New Musical – 2012

Book by David Hutchinson, Lyrics by Paddy Clarke and Music by Michael Bradley

== Credits ==
=== Producer – Sell a Door Theatre Company ===
- 2021 Bring It On the Musical, Book by Jeff Whitty, Music by Tom Kitt & Lin-Manuel Miranda, Lyrics by Amanda Green & Lin-Manuel Miranda
- 2021 We Will Rock You, Book by Ben Elton, Music & Lyrics by Queen
- 2021 Footloose The Musical, by Dean Pitchford
- 2020 Oor Wullie, by Noisemaker
- 2019 9 to 5 The Musical, Book by Patricia Resnick, Music & Lyrics by Dolly Parton
- 2019 Frankenstein, Adapted by Rona Munro
- 2019 Mr. Men & Little Miss on Stage, Composed by Harry Sever
- 2019 Falsettos, Booky by James Lapine, Music & Lyrics by William Finn
- 2019 Elmer The Patchwork Elephant Show, Based on the children's book series by David McKee, Adapted by Suzanne Miller, Songs written by Allison Leyton-Brown
- 2019 Rock of Ages The Musical, by Chris D'Arienzo
- 2019 Amelie The Musical, Book by Craig Lucas, Music by Daniel Messe, Lyrics by Nathan Tysen & Daniel Messe
- 2019 Little Miss Sunshine The Musical, Book by James Lapine, Music & Lyrics by William Finn
- 2019 Avenue Q, Conceived by Robert Lopez and Jeff Marx
- 2019 American Idiot, by Green Day, Billie Joe Armstrong and Michael Mayer
- 2018 Fame, Book by Jose Fernandez, Lyrics byJacques Levy, Composer: Steve Margoshes
- 2018 Madagascar A Musical Adventure, Book by Kevin Del Aguila, Music and Lyrics buGeorge Noriega & Joel Someillan
- 2018 Kindertransport, by Diane Samuels
- 2018 Of Mice And Men, by John Steinbeck
- 2017 Peter Pan A Musical Adventure, by J.M Barrie, adapted by Robert Marsden
- 2017 Big Fish, Book by John August, Music & Lyrics by Andrew Lippa
- 2017 The Producers, by Mel Brooks
- 2017 Jersey Boys, Book by Marshall Brickman & Rick Elice, Lyrics by Bob Crewe
- 2017 The Very Hungry Caterpillar, Based on the books by Eric Carle
- 2017 Spamalot, by Eric Idle
- 2017 Flashdance The Musical, Book by Tom Hedley & Robert Cary, Composed by Robbie Roth
- 2017 Footloose The Musical, by Dean Pitchford
- 2017 Guess How Much I Love You, based on the book by Sam McBratney
- 2017 The Quite Remarkable Adventures of the Owl and the Pussycat, Book by Eric Idle, adapted by Dougal Irvine
- 2017 The Crucible, by Arthur Miller
- 2016 The Broons, by DC Thomson, adapted by Rob Drummond
- 2016 Little Shop of Horrors, Book by Howard Ashamn, Composed by Alan Menken
- 2016 Footloose The Musical, by Dean Pitchford
- 2016 American Idiot, by Billie Joe Armstrong
- 2016 Hand to God, by Robert Askins
- 2016 Avenue Q, conceived by Robert Lopez
- 2016 James and the Giant Peach, by Roald Dahl
- 2016 Meantime, Greenwich Young Writers Programme (2016)
- 2015 Silver Sword, By Ian Serraillier, Adapted by Susie McKenna and Steven Edis
- 2015 Seussical, Book & Lyrics by Lynn Ahrens, Composed by Stephen Flaherty
- 2015 "Jekyll and Hyde" adapted by Jo Clifford
- 2015 "The History Boys" by Alan Bennett
- 2014 Sunset Song adapted by Alastair Cording
- 2014 Avenue Q conceived by Robert Lopez and Jeff Marx
- 2014 Kidnapped adapted by Ivan Wilkinson
- 2013 Seussical by Lynn Ahrens and Stephen Flaherty
- 2013 Ghosts adapted by Alfred Enoch
- 2013 Sincerely, Mr Toad by David Hutchinson, David Andrew Wilson and Katie McIvor
- 2013 1984 adapted by Matthew Dunster
- 2013 A Midsummer Nights Dream by William Shakespeare
- 2013 Journey's End by R.C Sherriff
- 2012 Seussical by Lynn Ahrens and Stephen Flaherty
- 2012 Rainbow by Emily Jenkins
- 2012 Sealand by Luke Clarke
- 2012 Peter by Stacy Sobieski
- 2012 The Man Who Had All the Luck by Arthur Miller
- 2012 The Hound of the Baskervilles adapted by Tim Kelly
- 2012 The History Boys by Alan Bennett
- 2011 A Christmas Carol Adapted by David Hutchinson & Anna Schneider
- 2011 Lord of the Flies Adapted by Nigel Williams
- 2011 Spring Awakening by Steven Sater and Duncan Sheik
- 2011 Proof by David Auburn
- 2011 A Taste of Honey by Shelagh Delaney
- 2011 The Comedy of Errors by William Shakespeare
- 2010 Dracula by Liz Lochhead
- 2010 Ms Minelli and the Daring Do by Sam Thackray
- 2010 The Railway Children by Dave Simpson
- 2010 Stitching by Anthony Neilson
- 2010 The House of Mirrors and Hearts by Eamonn O'Dwyer and Robert Gilbert
- 2010 Next Thing You Know by Joshua Salzman and Ryan Cunningham
- 2010 Scaredy Cat Prince by David Hutchinson
- 2010 The Philanderer by George Bernard Shaw
- 2010 Where the Solitary Eagle Flies by David Hutchinson
- 2010 Twelfth Night by William Shakespeare
- 2009 Blue/Orange by Joe Penhall
- 2009 Six Ways by David Hutchinson, Paddy Clarke and Michael Bradley
- 2009 Falsettoland by William Finn and James Lapine
- 2009 By Order of Ignorance by Robert Gilbert
- 2009 Planning Permission by David Hutchinson
- 2009 The Jason Robert Brown Song Cycle created by Michael Bradley
- 2008 The Ugly One by Marius von Mayenburg
- 2008 The Night Before Christmas by Anthony Neilson
- 2008 The Sugar Syndrome by Lucy Prebble
- 2008 So Much to Say for Myself by Robert Gilbert
- 2008 Heart and Music by David Hutchinson
- 2008 Treats by Christopher Hampton
- 2008 The Secrets Inside by David Hutchinson
- 2007 Two by Jim Cartwright
