= Mark Featherstone-Witty =

British teacher and executive

Mark Featherstone-Witty OBE
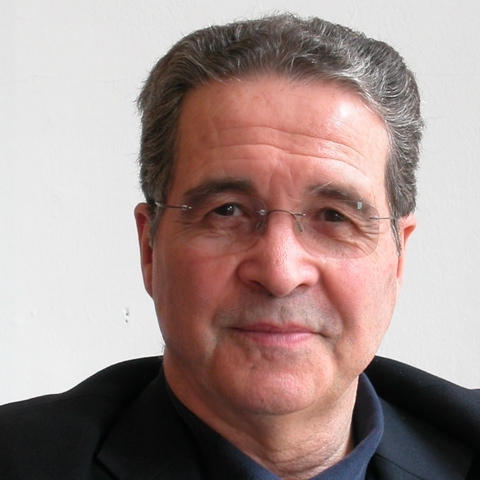
- Born: 2 June 1946 (age 80); London, Greater London, England
- Occupations: Founding Principal & Chief Executive of the Liverpool Institute for Performing Arts
- Spouse: Alison Featherstone
- Website: lipa.ac.uk

Sir Mark Featherstone-Witty OBE (born 2 June 1946 in London) is an educator and entrepreneur. He is the founding principal and chief executive of the Liverpool Institute for Performing Arts (LIPA) which he founded, with Paul McCartney, in the mid-1990s, after establishing the British Record Industry Trust BRIT School in Croydon with Richard Branson.

== Early life and education ==
Born in London to Evy and Philip Featherstone-Witty, he was an only child of parents who divorced when he was eleven. His secondary school was Wellington College (1959–1967), which proved unsuitable for his interest in the performing arts. But he did manage to produce, direct and act in a play. He charts his interest in the performing arts from the age of eight, when he saw the 1933 American musical film 42nd Street at the National Film Theatre in London; featuring dance routines by Busby Berkeley.

After a brief career accountancy and teaching in prep schools in Kent and Oxford, Featherstone-Witty attended Durham University (1969–1972), graduating with a degree in Arts Combined Honours. He edited the university newspaper Palatinate in 1971. as well as acting and producing shows. He also created and edited a regional arts magazine for the North-East of England, 'Face North'.

Before leaving, he gained the Gertrude Cole Fellowship at Rollins College, Winter Park, Florida, which he completed a year later, in counselling and psychology (MEd) He was elected to the US's highest honour society. During his year in the United States, he continued to perform and appeared as a hairdresser in the 1974 Sackett – Hugh film production 'The Meal', later renamed 'Deadly Encounter'.

== Career ==
After a spell teaching in London comprehensive schools, he joined Macmillan Education as an assistant editor, co-creating one of their most successful English textbook series. He left to teach at The Leventhorpe School, a comprehensive school in Hertfordshire. He also worked as the Consultative Education Editor for Quartet Books (1984–1986) and wrote book reviews and profiles for a variety of national magazines and newspapers.

He became Principal of Holborn Tutorial College for two years before founding his own tutorial college, Capital College, in 1980. For the next nine years, he either founded, co-founded or assisted two additional private enterprise, further education colleges: The London School of Insurance and The London School of Publishing, and a television production company (Rainbow Education). This company developed a six-part television series, 'Whose Town Is It Anyway?’ for the then embryonic Channel Four.

During this period, he watched Alan Parker's film Fame, about a performing arts school in New York City. He decided his next venture would be a performing arts school with a curriculum that focused on achieving lasting work in the arts and entertainment industry. He also decided that the school would be a charity and set about creating the vehicle, 'The Schools for Performing Arts Trust', bringing Anthony Field, former Finance Director of The UK Arts Council, on board as the chair, and inviting Alan Parker to be the first Patron for what was an idea.

== Founding The Brit School ==
The project champion for the BRIT School was Richard Branson, who had been introduced to Mark Featherstone-Witty by Sir George Martin – the man who Mark Featherstone-Witty still describes as the godfather of both The BRIT School and LIPA. Through extraordinary timing, a variety of needs could be met by a new performing arts school in London. The Conservative Government needed an attractive project to invigorate its somewhat flagging City Technology College initiative and the British record industry needed political influence: first named 'The London School for Performing Arts and Technology', this new institution was to be the vehicle. Mark Featherstone-Witty describes this period of development in his 2001 book 'Optimistic, Even Then'.

== Founding The Liverpool Institute for Performing Arts (LIPA) ==
Paul McCartney was writing his Liverpool Oratorio and decided to relive his schooldays by visiting his old school, the Liverpool Institute for Boys. He was dismayed by the dereliction of the abandoned building and believed that it deserved better. Someone had suggested that Liverpool needed a performing arts school. This idea remained dormant until Sir George Martin suggested McCartney meet Featherstone-Witty.

At the time, well before Liverpool achieved the European Capital of Culture in 2008, Liverpool City Council decided that the city should capitalise on its music heritage and commissioned the report 'Music City'. Pete Fulwell, then managing The Christians, found Featherstone-Witty through Island Records, the record label the band was signed to. The education/training section of the Liverpool Report became a kind of blueprint for the development of LIPA.

Featherstone-Witty led the campaign for developmental and capital funding. In the end, the £20m funding needed was gained three ways: through Liverpool City Challenge, The European Union and the private sector. The largest donors in the last category were Paul McCartney and the German consumer electronics company, Grundig.

== LIPA ==
LIPA celebrated its tenth birthday in January 2006 with a performance at the Liverpool Philharmonic Hall. Mark published a book, 'LIPA – The First Ten Years in Pictures', to commemorate this anniversary. LIPA was recognized in 2006 as the first new higher education institution to have been started from scratch in living memory. As a performing arts HEI, LIPA is still attended by the highest number of international students in the UK.

Most recent figures have shown that over the most recent four-year period, 92% of LIPA's graduates are in work three years after leaving, while 84% work in the performing arts. To achieve this, the curriculum is constantly being revised.

LIPA has been awarded the Gold Standard from Investors in People. Teaching Excellence Framework (TEF): LIPA was placed in the gold category, achieving the 15th highest award in the country. LIPA also has the highest concentration of Fellows and Associates recognised by the Higher Education Academy.

In September 2014, the LIPA Primary School opened with two reception classes. In September 2016, the LIPA Sixth Form College opened with 12 students above the planned upper target of 180. In 2019 LIPA Sixth Form College(LSFC)was rated as 'outstanding' in all areas by OFSTED.

== Awards ==
- Featherstone-Witty was appointed Officer of the Order of the British Empire (OBE) in the 2014 Birthday Honours for services to higher education.
- In March 2015, he was awarded the Officer of the Royal Norwegian Order of Merit (Knight First Class). Conferring him the title of "Sir".
- In June 2017, he was awarded an Honorary Fellow of The Institute of the Arts Barcelona.
- In July 2017, he was awarded an Honorary Fellowship by Liverpool John Moores University.

== Other activities ==
He was the chair of the Sefton Park Palm House – a restored Victorian temperate glass house in the park close to his home. He was a board member of the National Academy of Writing. He is a board member of the Royal Court Theatre Liverpool Trust, which completed the first phase of restoration in 2011 and aims to further refurbish this grand art deco theatre. He has been a judge for The Liverpool Music Awards since 2012. He is a member and director of The LIPA Primary School, as well as the LIPA Sixth Form College. He is a director of the Sell A Door Theatre Company. He encouraged Harvey Goldsmith to relocate his legacy experience 'The British Music Experience' to Liverpool, where it has opened in the Cunard Building. He is now a trustee, while LIPA is the educational partner.

== Writing ==
- 2001 Optimistic, Event Then
- 2006 LIPA in Pictures; The First Ten Years
