= Dave Hutchison (footballer) =

Australian rules footballer

Personal information
- Full name: David Hutchison
- Born: 1 March 1870; Daylesford, Victoria
- Died: 1 June 1956 (aged 86); Warragul, Victoria

Playing career^{1}
Years	Club	Games (Goals)
1899	South Melbourne	2 (0)
- ^{1} Playing statistics correct to the end of 1899.

Dave Hutchison (1 March 1870 – 1 June 1956) was an Australian rules footballer who played with South Melbourne in the Victorian Football League (VFL).
