= Trackless tram =

Trackless tram may refer to:

- Autonomous Rail Rapid Transit
- Bi-articulated bus
- Guided bus
- Rubber-tyred tram
- Trolleybus
