= Liverpool Medical Students Society =

- Motto: Non Nobis Laboramus "We Labour Not for Ourselves"
- Established: 1874
- President: Kieran Banner
- Treasurer: Haris Sultan
- Members: over 1000
- Honorary Life President: Ron Templeton
- Website: lmss.square.site

The Liverpool Medical Students Society (LMSS) is the official Medsoc of the School of Medicine at the University of Liverpool. The mission of the society is to represent and care for the students of the School of Medicine of the University of Liverpool. It is a Registered Charity in its own right, providing complete independence from the Liverpool Guild of Students, the University's Students' Union, to which it was previously affiliated. The Society's weekly Thursday meetings are held in the Grade II-listed Victoria Building. The Society's principal roles include the educational, pastoral, social and extracurricular needs of the Liverpool medical students and to represent the students' voice to the staff of the School of Medicine.

The Society also holds meetings and events at the Liverpool Medical Institution and the Liverpool Athenaeum, a private members' club in Liverpool city centre.

The Society's Honorary President for 2020/21 is the Executive Pro-Vice Chancellor of the University of Liverpool Faculty of Health and Life Science, Louise Kenny.

== History ==
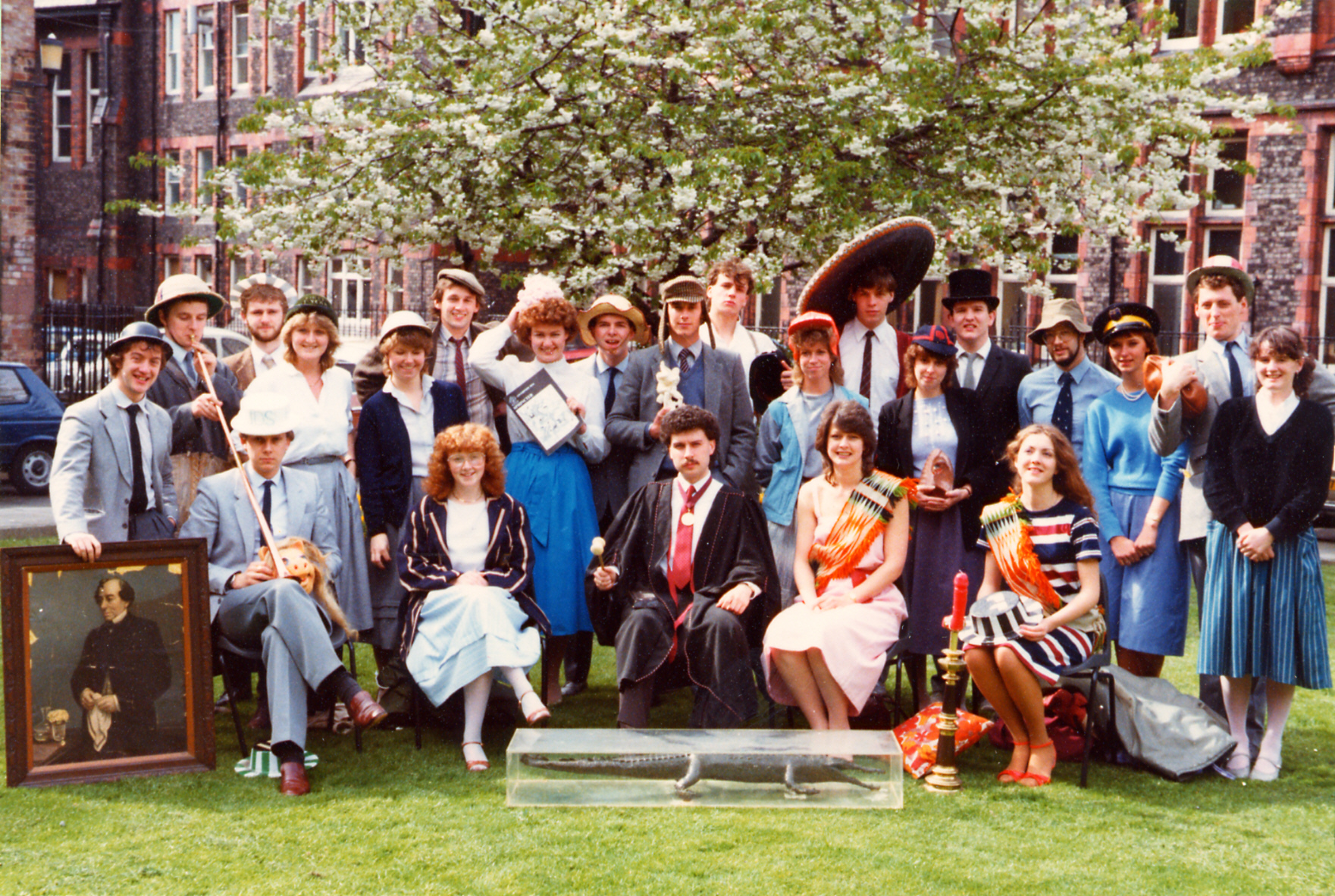
Medical Students' Society in 1980s, with mascots

The Liverpool Royal Infirmary School of Medicine Debating Society (MSDS) was founded in 1874 by Richard Caton. The society was formed seven years ahead of the University of Liverpool. The original society was a male-only entity, and often debated such things as whether females should be admitted into the medical school. In 1885 it became the University College Medical School Debating Society, then 1902 a further change of name to the Liverpool University Medical School Debating Society. The society finally decided to admit female medical students in 1905, and the first female doctor to graduate from Liverpool was Phoebe Powell in 1910.The society began publishing a magazine "the Sphincter" in 1937 a play on the university student magazine the Sphinx In 1943 the society changed their name to the "Liverpool Medical Students Society", wanting to being recognised for more than debating. The society is the longest-running students society at the university.

The Society records the names of its Student Officers and Honorary Presidents in the Jack Leggate Theatre of the Victoria Gallery & Museum. Previous Honorary Presidents of the Society have included Henry Cohen, 1st Baron Cohen of Birkenhead, Sir Ian Gilmore, Sir Cyril A. Clarke, and Thomas Cecil Gray. It's plaque reads:

"Established as Royal Liverpool Infirmary School of Medicine Debating Society in 1874 byRichard Caton, Making this the oldest society of its kind in the country. Continued as University College Medical School Debating Society from 1885, Becoming Liverpool University Medical School Debating Society in 1902. It was finally transformed to Liverpool Medical Students Society in 1943."

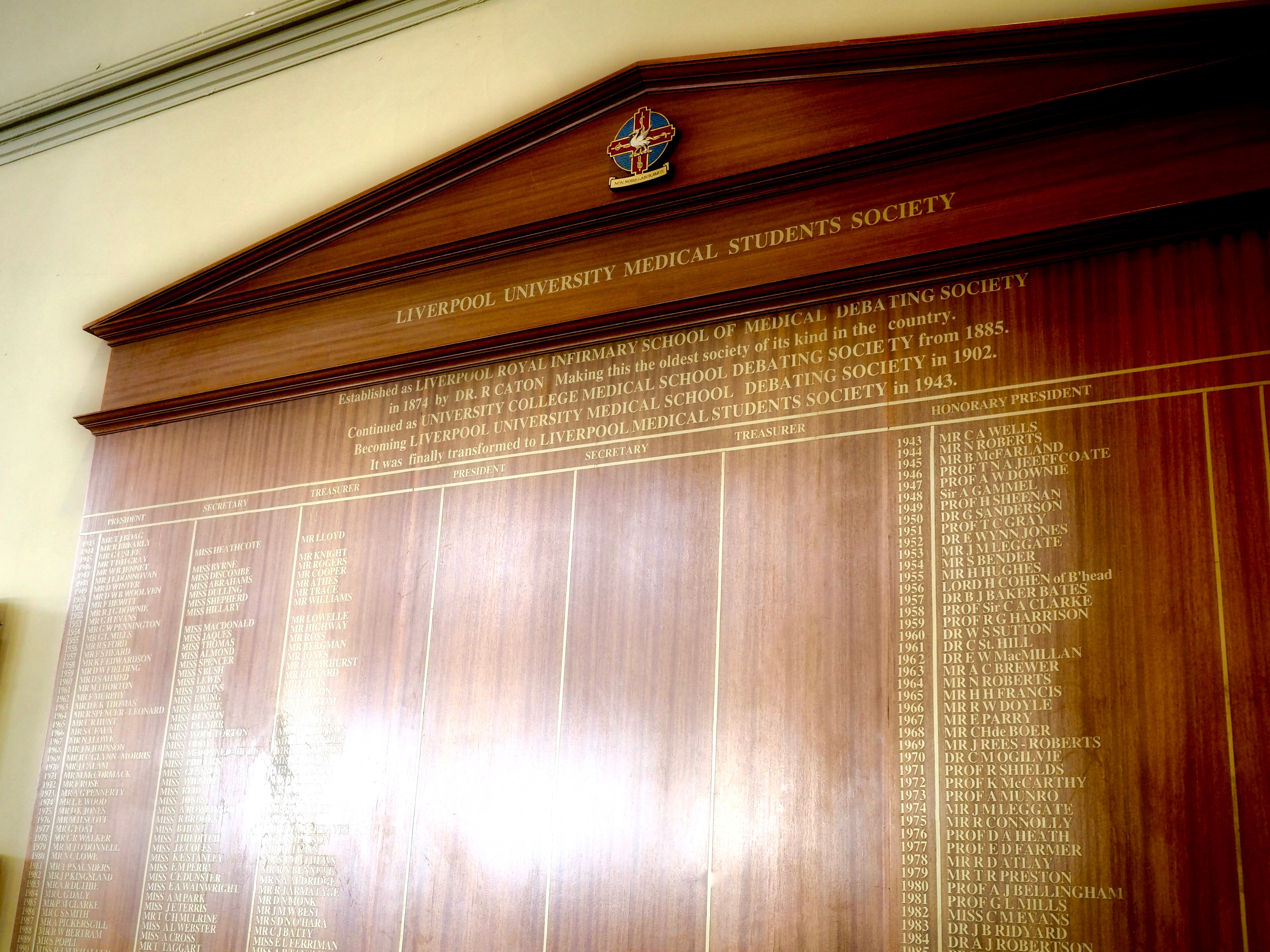
The LMSS Officer Board depicting the names of all Officers and Hon. Presidents of the Society in the Victoria Gallery & Museum at the University of Liverpool

=== 2014–2016: Smoking concert dispute ===
More recently, the Society gathered national media attention for its "Jack Leggate" song and its annual Smoking concert which started in the 1880s. On 10 November 2014 the online feminist magazine The Vagenda tweeted a screenshot which apparently showed a proposed script for the Annual Smoking Concert which had been circulated among fourth year medical students. The explicit content sparked claims that students responsible were misogynistic and that the concert itself was contributing to a "Lad culture" at the university.

The university and Liverpool Guild of Students subsequently released a press statement condemning the content and promising an internal inquiry into the materials for the production. On 14 January 2016, Liverpool Guild of Students officially de-ratified the society, barring its use of guild services.

On 15 January 2016, a petition was created on change.org opposing the de-ratification of the LMSS, which demanded the immediate resignation of Liverpool Guild of Students President Harry Anderson. The petition gained over 1,200 signatures in 3 days. The society maintains its commitment to change its perceived culture of exclusivity with a revamped agenda on cultural diversity and inclusion and build on its longstanding tradition of charity work.

On 5 February 2019, it was announced that the LMSS was fully re-integrating with the University of Liverpool.

== Governance ==
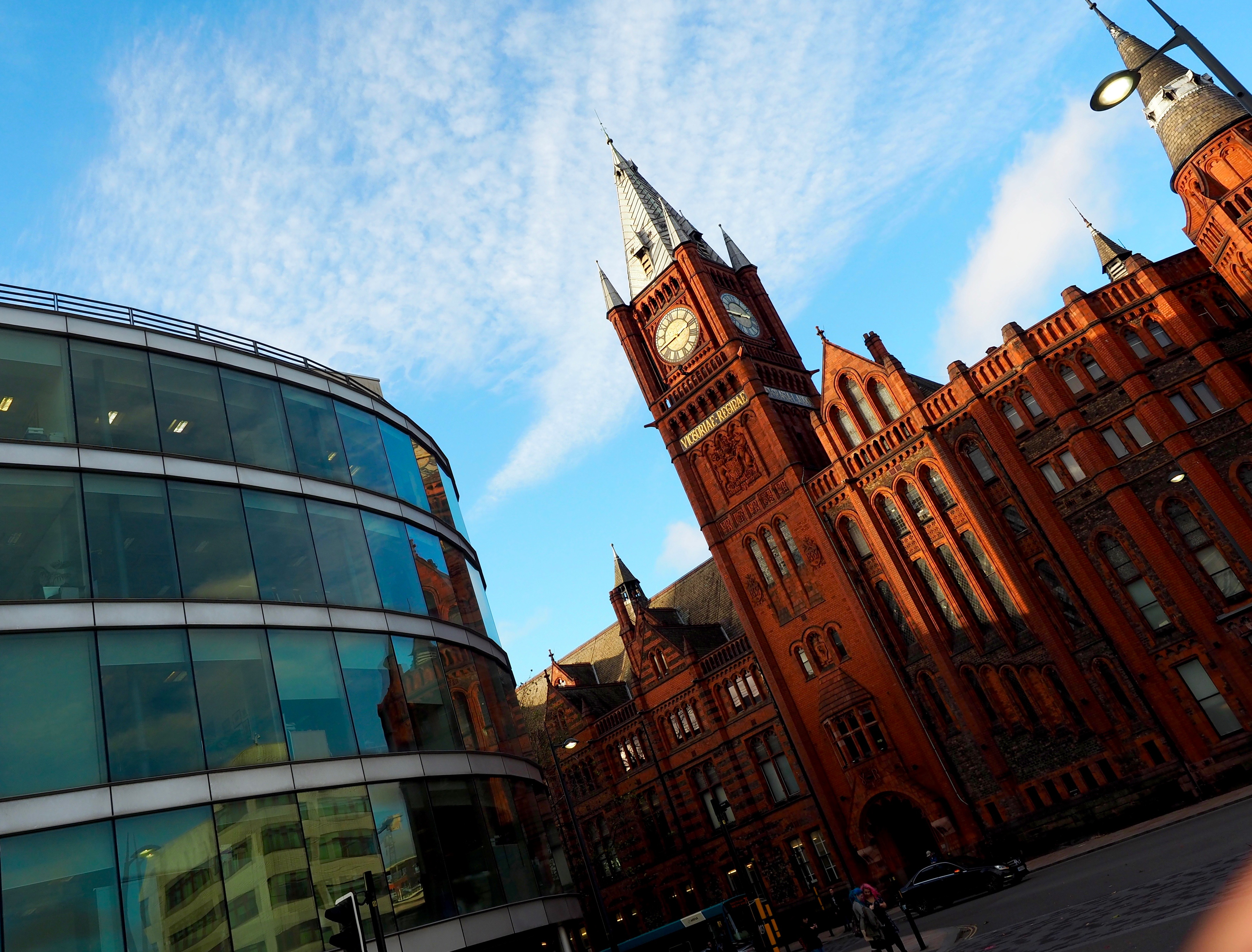
The Victoria Building (above) where the weekly 'Ordinary Meetings' take place

The Society is registered as a charity in England and Wales. The board consists of 14 members, of whom most are senior practicing Medical Practitioners and eminent Alumni. The Society is run primarily by three officers, the President, Treasurer and Secretary. A full committee of 39 medical students is elected at the AGM. They cover a portfolio of areas including entertainment & socials, charities, welfare, clubs & societies and the Annual Medical Ball.

Notable alumni who have served as Officers or Committee Members, and/or have demonstrated an exceptional and sustained commitment to multiple avenues of Society activity, to tirelessly further the interests of the Society are elevated to Honorary Life Membership of the Society.

== Meetings ==
The Society holds meetings on Thursdays where a Guest is invited to address the Society.

== Notable alumni & honorary presidents ==
- Sir Cyril A. Clarke
- Richard Caton
- Sir Ian Gilmore
- Thomas Cecil Gray
- John (Jack) Mortimer Leggate
- Henry Cohen, 1st Baron Cohen of Birkenhead
- Ruth Hussey
- Sir David Weatherall, Regius Professor of Medicine
- Averil Mansfield
