= University of Liverpool School of Medicine =

Medical school in Liverpool, UK

Coordinates: 53.407°N 2.967°W

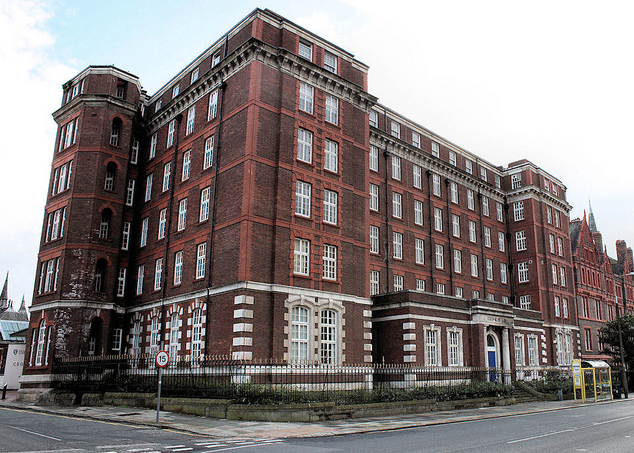
- Cedar House (above) is the main Medical School building.
- Type: Public Medical School
- Established: 1834; 192 years ago Incorporated 1903
- Affiliations: General Medical Council
- Undergraduates: circa 1,800
- Postgraduates: circa 1,200
- Location: Liverpool, England, United Kingdom
- Campus: Urban
- Dean: Hazel Scott
- Website: www.liv.ac.uk/medicine

The University of Liverpool School of Medicine is a medical school located in Liverpool, United Kingdom and a part of the University of Liverpool. It is one of the largest medical schools in the UK, and in 1903 became one of the first to be incorporated into a university.

The school used to have a problem-based learning curriculum, which was replaced in 2014 with a new 'integrated' curriculum for its flagship five-year MBChB course, which has an annual intake of 340 students. Around 1400 medical undergraduates and 600 taught postgraduates study at the school at any one time. The school also offers an MD programme and courses for continuing professional development.

== History ==
A medical school in Liverpool was established in 1834. Dr Richard Formby, who ran a course of lectures in anatomy and physiology since 1818, joined with a group of colleagues to form a school of medicine attached to the Liverpool Royal Institution, which occupied rooms in Colquitt Street. William Gill (surgeon), who had set up a second Anatomy School in Liverpool in 1827, accepted a joint Lectureship in Anatomy with Dr Formby, who also lectured in Medicine. Other doctors from the Infirmary and Dispensary lectured on Surgery, Chemistry, Midwifery and Medical jurisprudence. In 1844, the medical school became attached to the Liverpool Infirmary, which was renamed in 1851 to become the Liverpool Royal Infirmary School of Medicine.

In November 1877, a joint meeting was held between the Liverpool Association for the Promotion of Higher Education and the Council of the School of Medicine to look to establishing a University in Liverpool. Several staff members of the medical school were mentioned at the meeting including Dr Richard Caton, William Mitchell Banks and Reginald Harrison. That same year, Experimental physics was included in the syllabus for University of London medical degrees, which Liverpool could not provide. Thus, University College Liverpool was eventually established in 1881.

The Royal Infirmary School of Medicine initially kept its independence, but in 1884 became the Faculty of Medicine when University College was affiliated to Victoria University, along with Owen's College, Manchester and Yorkshire College, Leeds. Victoria University had the power to award medical degrees with its own syllabus requirements. The University of Liverpool received its royal charter in 1903, establishing its independence and leading the way for many provincial medical schools. This also made it possible for degrees to be awarded to women.

The associated Liverpool School of Tropical Medicine was the first school of Tropical Medicine in the world.

In 2011 following an internal restructure of the University, the Faculty of Medicine was demoted back to School status under the stewardship of the new Faculty of Health and Life Sciences.

== Facilities ==
The school's facilities have recently undergone a massive refurbishment and redevelopment. The refurbished Liverpool Royal Infirmary Waterhouse buildings house the Clinical Skills Resource Centre for clinical teaching, and a centre for the development of personalised medicine. The school also makes use of a Human Anatomy Resource Centre for anatomy teaching.

The School of Medicine is based in the 19th century Cedar House building on Ashton Street. Cedar House includes teaching rooms, administrative offices for the senior management, and a medical student common room.

=== Teaching hospitals ===
The medical school has close links with the region's NHS organisations, which are actively involved in designing its courses and in hosting students for the practical aspects of training. Hospitals include: Royal Liverpool University Hospital, Broadgreen Hospital, Whiston Hospital, Aintree University Hospital, The Walton Centre for Neurology and Neurosurgery, Arrowe Park Hospital, Liverpool Women's Hospital, Countess of Chester Hospital, Warrington Hospital and Alder Hey Children's Hospital. The medical school also has close links with the Liverpool School of Tropical Medicine.

== Courses ==
The School provides undergraduate and postgraduate courses in medicine.

In 2011 there were around 1,400 undergraduate students enrolled on the MBChB course and 600 taught postgraduates

For the five-year A100 course, the current conditional offer given to a student taking A-Level examinations is AAA, to include Biology and Chemistry at A-Level. Candidates are required to sit the UCAT examination. The style of interviews is MMI (Multiple Mini Interviews).

As with all UK Medical Students, successful applicants must be immunised against Hepatitis B, Diphtheria, Polio, Rubella, Tetanus, Varicella and Tuberculosis.

== Notable staff members ==
- Dr Richard Formby, founder of Liverpool Medical School
- William Gill (surgeon), one of the first anatomy teachers at Liverpool Medical School
- Dr Richard Caton, physician, prominent physiologist, inaugural president of Liverpool Royal Infirmary School of Medicine Debating Society, president of Liverpool Medical Institution
- William Mitchell Banks, surgeon and first Chair of Anatomy, president of Liverpool Medical Institution (1890)
- William Thelwall Thomas, surgeon, president of Liverpool Medical Institution (1918)
- Sir Charles Scott Sherrington, prominent physiologist, the discoverer of the synapse, president of Liverpool Medical Institution

== Notable alumni ==
Alumni include:

- Lord Henry Cohen (21 February 1900 – 7 August 1977), a prominent lecturer at the medical school and taught there for over five decades
- Linda de Cossart, graduated 1972, vascular surgeon
- Andrew Cudworth, graduated 1963, endocrinologist
- Thomas Cecil Gray, pioneer in anaesthetics, medical historian, President of the Liverpool Medical Institution
- J.M. Leggate, graduated 1929, President of Guild of Students, Dean of Faculty of Medicine (1953 - 1969), lecture theatre in the Victoria Building is named after him
- Maurice Henry Pappworth - graduated1932 Medical ethicist and educator
- Averil Mansfield, graduated 1960, vascular surgeon
- Mary Sheridan, graduated 1922, paediatrician

== See also ==
- Liverpool School of Tropical Medicine
- Liverpool Medical Institution
- Healthcare in Liverpool
- Liverpool Royal Infirmary School of Medicine Debating Society
