= Richard Caton =

Dr Richard Caton CBE(1920) MB CM Edin(1867) MD Hon LLD Liverp Edin Hon Doctor Padua FRCP(1888)
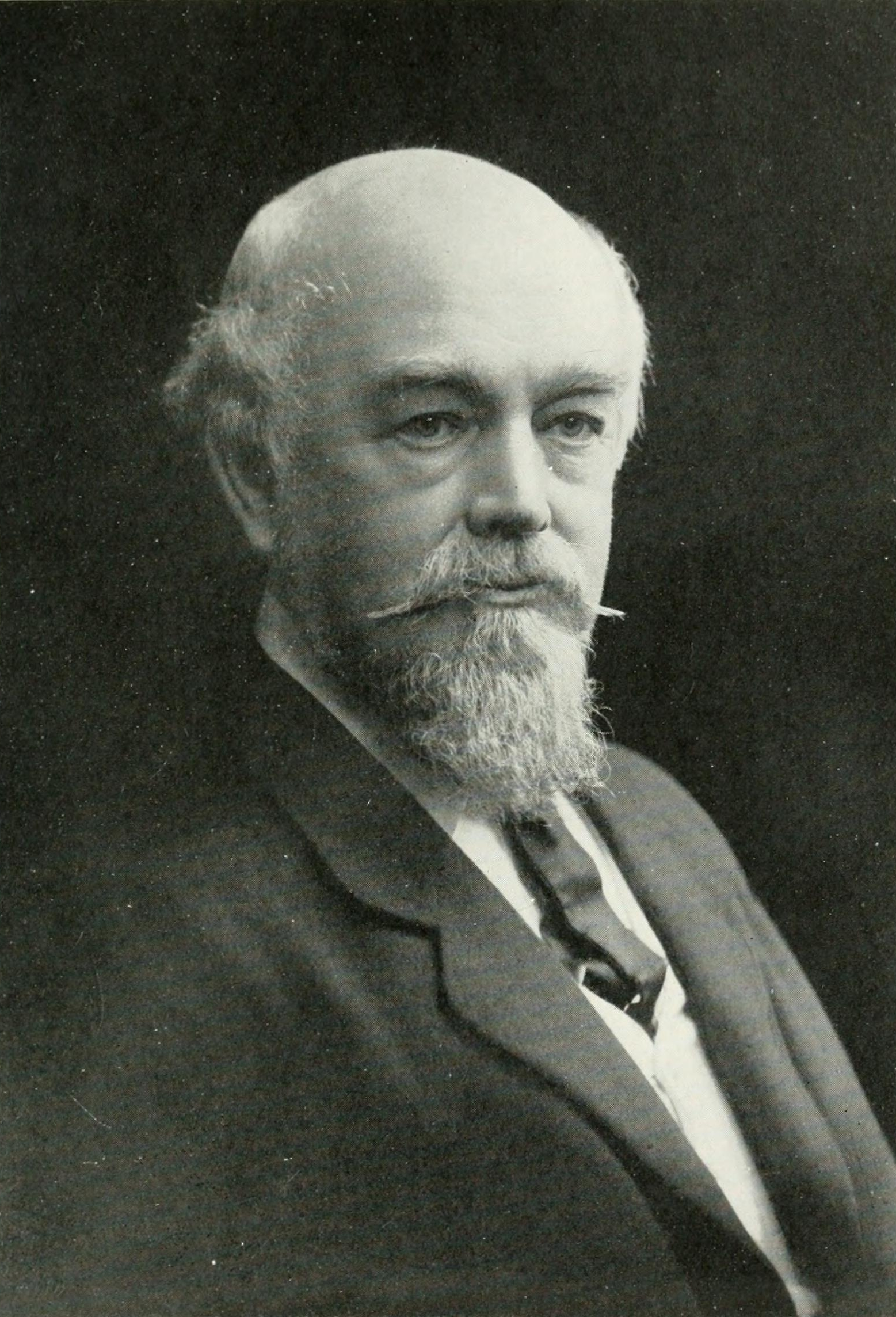
- Born: 26 July 1842; Bradford, England
- Died: 2 January 1926 (aged 83); Haslemere, England
- Education: Scarborough Grammar School; Edinburgh University
- Occupations: Physician, professor of physiology, Lord Mayor of Liverpool (1907–08), Pro-vice-chancellor of University of Liverpool
- Known for: Research into electrophysiology, medical education
- Spouse: Annie Ivory (1855–1912)
- Children: Anne Rose, Mildred Robina
- Parent(s): Richard Caton, M.D (1809–1852), Mary Fawcett (1811–1873)

Signature
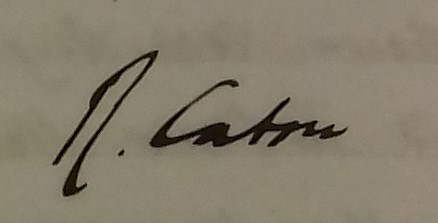

Richard Caton (1842, Bradford – 1926), of Liverpool, England, was a British physician, physiologist and Lord Mayor of Liverpool who was crucial in discovering the electrical nature of the brain and laid the groundwork for Hans Berger to discover alpha wave activity in the human brain.

== Early life and education ==
Richard Caton was born in Bradford, son of Richard Caton M.D. and Mary Fawcett. He had a younger sister, Sarah (1846–1872). His father gave up his medical practice through ill health and moved to Scarborough where he died. Following this, the family returned to his mother's former home of Halifax. Caton became a boarder at Scarborough Grammar School where he developed a life-long love of the classics, reflected in later life when he wrote a number of papers on Ancient Greek medicine. Leaving school at sixteen, he worked in the Halifax and Huddersfield Bank but had to leave due to ill health. The medical treatment he received sparked an interest in practising medicine himself. In 1863 after receiving a small legacy from an aunt, he and his mother were able to move to Scotland where he attended Edinburgh Medical School qualifying MB in 1867, FRCP in 1868, and MD in 1870.

== Physician ==
After graduating, Caton was resident at the Edinburgh Royal Infirmary and the Royal Hospital for Sick Children, Edinburgh. He moved to Liverpool in 1868 and became assistant physician to The Liverpool Infirmary for Children. He was physician to the Northern Hospital, Liverpool from 1876 to 1886, and physician to the Liverpool Royal Infirmary from 1886 to 1902, where he became consulting physician upon his retirement. He was Vice-Chairman of the Liverpool School of Tropical Medicine from its foundation in 1899.

== Medical educator ==
=== Royal Infirmary School of Medicine (1869–1881) ===
In 1869 Dr Richard Caton was Demonstrator in Comparative Anatomy at the Liverpool Royal Infirmary School of Medicine which at the time allowed degrees to be taken at University of London. He became part-time Demonstrator in Physiology in 1871. He played a crucial part in the expansion of the medical school, which included a physiology laboratory opened in 1873. At an introductory address to medical students that year he reported that "it may now fairly be said that for its size there is no school in the country more fully equipped for the work of medical teaching, in all its scientific and practical departments."

=== University College (1882–1902) ===
Dr Richard Caton played a key role in establishing higher education in Liverpool. In November 1877, a joint meeting was held between the Liverpool Association for the Promotion of Higher Education and the Council of the School of Medicine to look to establishing a University in Liverpool. That same year, Experimental physics was included in the syllabus for London University degrees, which Liverpool could not provide. Thus, University College Liverpool was established by Royal charter in 1881. The Royal Infirmary School of Medicine initially kept its independence, but in 1884 became the Faculty of medicine when University College was affiliated to Victoria University, along with Owen's College, Manchester and Yorkshire College, Leeds. Victoria University had the power to award medical degrees with its own syllabus requirements.

Caton worked as part-time Professor of Physiology from 1882 to 1891. When George Holt, the shipping line owner, endowed the Chair of Physiology at University College Liverpool in 1891 as a full-time appointment, Caton resigned in favour of Francis Gotch (1853–1913) who was succeeded in 1895 by Charles Scott Sherrington (1857–1952). An appeal for funds in 1887, which included £50 from Caton, allowed the construction of the Victoria Building in 1892 on the site of the former lunatic asylum on Brownlow Hill.

=== University of Liverpool (1903–1924) ===
Dr Richard Caton was on the Court of Governors of the University from the start. He and others lobbied hard for an independent University of Liverpool which was achieved in 1903. Manchester and Leeds followed in 1904. In 1903, women were also granted the opportunity to be awarded degrees.

Caton was the first representative of Liverpool University on the General Medical Council— an office that he occupied until his death. He was a Pro-vice-chancellor of the University from 1921 to 1924, and served for a time as Dean of the Faculty of Medicine.

== Research ==
On 4 August 1875 Caton reported to the British Medical Association in Edinburgh (Caton 1875) that he had used a galvanometer to observe electrical impulses from the surfaces of living brains in the rabbit and monkey.(Smith 1970)(Finger 1994). After Caton died, Hans Berger was one of few to recognise his importance and cited him in his 1929 report on the discovery of Alpha waves. He wrote:

Caton had already (1874) published experiments on the brains of dogs and apes in which bare unipolar electrodes were placed either on the surface of both hemispheres or one electrode on the cerebral cortex and the other on the surface of the skull. The currents were measured by a sensitive galvanometer. There were found distinct variations in current, which increased during sleep and with the onset of death strengthened, and after death became weaker and then completely disappeared. Caton could show that strong current variations resulted in brain from light shone into the eyes, and he speaks already of the conjecture that under the circumstances these cortical currents could be applied to localization within the cortex of the brain — (Berger 1929).

Caton wrote a number of clinical papers for the British Medical Association, which arose from observations during his clinical practice. He wrote on such diverse topics as intestinal antisepsis, acromegaly, rheumatic endocarditis, cardiac dilatation and hypertrophy. He also developed his interest in the classics, giving a lecture to the Royal Institution, London, in 1898 on the topic of the excavations carried out by European and American archaeologists who deciphered inscriptions and restored buildings such as the Temple of Asklepios at Epidauros. In 1904, he gave his first Harveian lecture to the Royal College of Physicians on the topic of early Egyptian medicine.

== Other offices held ==
Dr Richard Caton was also President of the Liverpool Medical Institution (1896) where his portrait by G. Chowne hangs. He was President of the Liverpool Athenaeum Club. Caton was a founder-member of the Physiological Society (31 March 1876, London). In 1885 he was elected to the Clinical Society of London. He was Lord Mayor of Liverpool in 1907-8 and marked his term in office by presenting the University of Liverpool with a ceremonial mace. He was awarded an honorary LL.D degree from Edinburgh in 1908, from Liverpool in 1909 and from Padua in 1922. Padua was also where he represented Liverpool at the 700th anniversary of the foundation of the University. A committed Anglican, he served on the York House of Laymen. He was also on the building committee for the new Anglican Cathedral in Liverpool. He was alive to see the first stone laid in 1904. By his death in 1926, the altar, chancel and transepts were in place; the building was finally completed in 1978.

== The Royal Infirmary School of Medicine Debating Society ==
The Liverpool Royal Infirmary School of Medicine Debating Society (M.S.D.S.) was founded by staff and students at the medical school on 20 October 1874. This led to the formation of the Medical Students Society (M.S.S.) when its name was changed in 1943. Caton was elected its inaugural president, chairing the society's debates and taking detailed minutes. On Saturday 21 November 1874 Caton opened the proceedings with an address in which he expressed the prophetic opinion that "the Debating Society was destined to be one of the permanent institutions in the School of Medicine."

Educational activities included the presenting of both cases and specimens on a variety of medical and surgical subjects. Students presented papers on a range of topics including women in medicine, the medicinal benefits of corsets, germ theory and the theories of Lister's anti-sepsis, miasma theory, Spiritualism, galvanism and grammar school education.

Caton's enthusiasm for his students' education is demonstrated in 1875 when he describes what "excellent exercise it was to place their thoughts on paper and thoroughly to investigate any subject for the benefit of their fellow Student."

== Personal life ==
In 1869, Dr Richard Caton moved from Edinburgh to Liverpool, where he lived for the rest of his life. His mother died at his house in Abercromby Square in 1873. In 1885 he married Annie Ivory (1855–1912), daughter of an Edinburgh Solicitor. They had two daughters, Anne Rose and Mildred Robina, the former of whom became her father's companion in later years. Mildred married Henry Arderne Ormerod (1886–1964), Professor of Ancient History at Liverpool University. Their son W.E. Omerod preserved Caton's papers for posterity; these can be seen in the University of Liverpool Special Collections and Archives.

Caton lived at a number of addresses including Livingstone Drive Sefton Park, Balmoral Road Fairfield, Lea Hall Gateacre, and Sunnyside Princes Park. For his practice he had consulting rooms at 36 and 78 Rodney Street, Liverpool. His health worsening, with increasing sciatica, Caton moved to Surrey for warmer climes. He died in Haslemere on 2 January 1926. He was buried at All Saints' Church, Childwall, Liverpool, on 6 January 1926. His gravestone commemorates both him and his wife.

== Sources ==
- Berger, Hans (1929), "Über das Elektroenkephalogramm des Menschen", Arch. Psychiatr., 87: 527–570, doi:10.1007/BF01797193, hdl:11858/00-001M-0000-002A-5DE0-7, S2CID 10835361
- Caton, Richard (28 August 1875). "Electrical currents of the brain". British Medical Journal. 2 (765): 278. doi:10.1136/bmj.2.765.257. S2CID 220220901.
- Finger, Stanley (1994), Origins of Neuroscience: a history of explorations in brain function, New York: Oxford University Press, pp. 41–42
- Smith, C.U.M. (1970), The Brain: Towards an understanding, New York: G. P. Putnam's Sons
