= Liverpool Guild of Students =

Student union of University of Liverpool

- Institution: University of Liverpool
- Location: 160 Mount Pleasant, Liverpool, L3 5TR
- Established: 1889
- President: Sol Badruddin
- Other officers: Will Jones (deputy president); Lauren Goadby (vice-president); Fin Deane (vice-president)
- Affiliations: National Union of Students (formerly), Aldwych Group
- Website: www.liverpoolguild.org

The Liverpool Guild of Students is the students' union of the University of Liverpool. The guild was founded in 1889, with the building constructed in 1911.

The title also refers to the Guild of Students building, which is the centre point of activity in student life at the University and is run by the four sabbatical officers who are elected annually in an all-student ballot. Following a £14.25m refurbishment in 2013, it now contains a cinema, a theatre, a shop, two dance studios, four bars, a 2,300 capacity gig venue and an underground nightclub. This is as well as administrative offices and society meeting rooms. The guild regularly hosts live music, theatre and comedy.

== Governance ==
The board of trustees are responsible for overseeing the management and administration of the union, making the financial decisions, responding to student demands and ensuring activities are within union aims and remain within the law. The board consists of 12 trustees: the 4 student officers, 4 student trustees and 4 external trustees. The chair of the Board is ex officio the Guild President.

== History ==
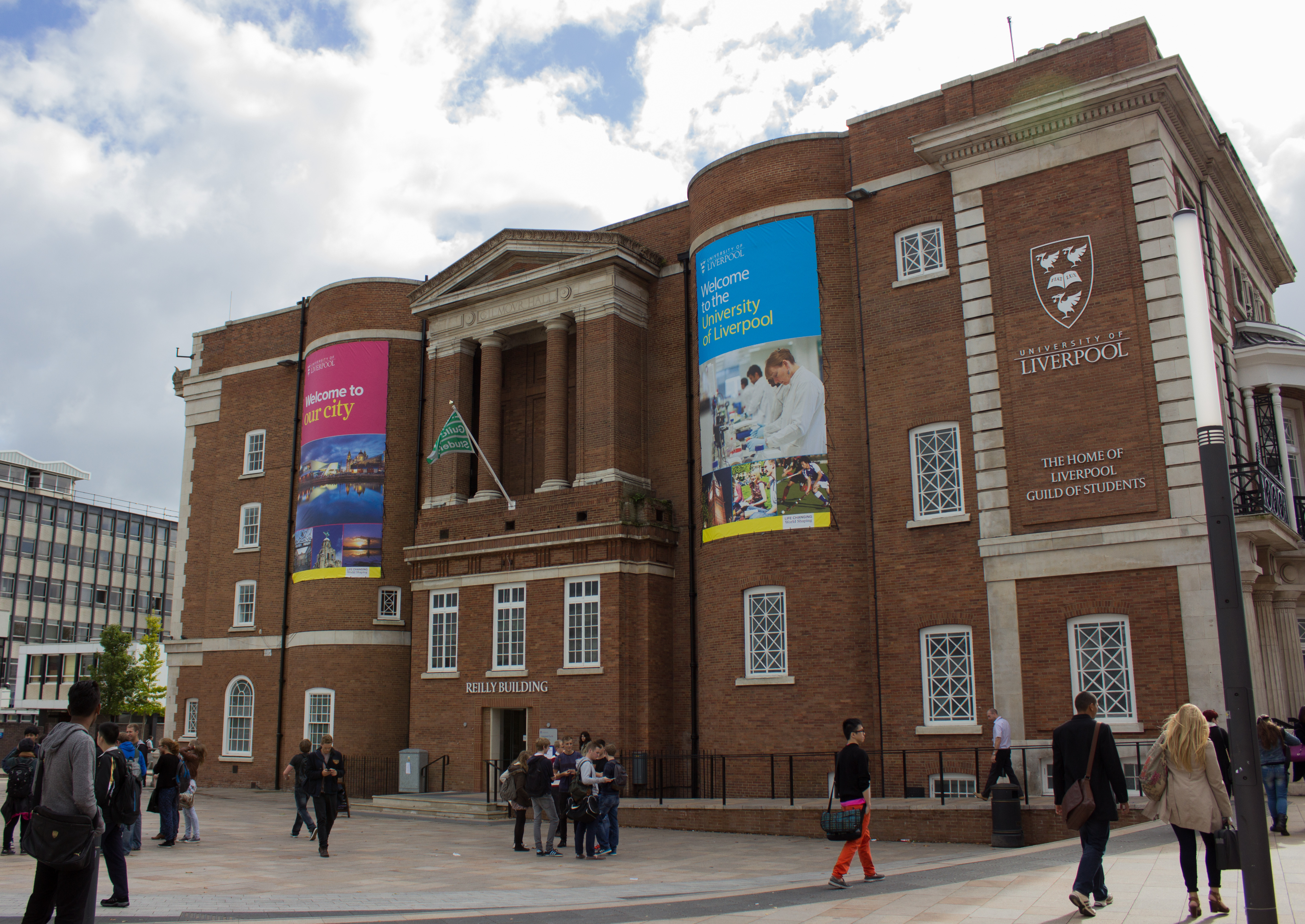
The Guild building

=== Origins of the Guild ===
The origins of the guild may be traced back to the establishment in 1892 of two Students' Representative Councils at University College, Liverpool. However, students were forming societies long before this, such as the Athletic Club in 1885, the Medical Students' Debating Society (later known as the Liverpool Medical Students Society) in 1874, the Women's Literary Society, and the Arts and Debating Society in 1888, among others. The University College Magazine documented the activities of these new groups, being first published in 1886. The guild building has been located on Mount Pleasant since 1911.

=== 20th century ===
The guild building is the work of Charles Herbert Reilly and was originally built with the west side for women and east for men, with the architecture of the building reflecting this. The building was built in three stages; the original building, housing the Gilmour Hall (then the debating chamber) was built in 1911. The middle section was built in the 1930s and the largest part, housing the Mountford Hall and the Courtyard was opened in 1966.

=== 21st century and refurbishment ===
In 2013, a £13.8 million refurbishment began on the Guild of Students building, to generally improve the building and add a new bar, cafe, and meeting areas. The Guild had not been renovated since the early 1990s. The work was long overdue, and the changes were enormous. The Liverpool Guild of Students had been living in a temporary and much smaller home at 3 –5 Abercromby Square. During this the guild endeavoured to continue its services and offer opportunities to its student population and many societies.

In 2026, the guild voted to formally disaffiliate from the National Union of Students following an all-student referendum.

=== History of live music ===
Liverpool Guild of Students has a long-established history in live music and has been providing a venue for events since the opening of its main room, the Mountford Hall, since 1965. During its history as a music venue, the guild has played host to some of the biggest names, acts such as The Who, The Pretenders, The Clash and Joy Division all having played sell-out, main room shows. More recently the venue has seen shows from James, Scouting for Girls and Thirty Seconds to Mars to name a few, in the main room and The Damned, Juliette Lewis and The Futureheads who have preferred the intimacy of the in-house theatre.

== Green Guild ==
Green Guild started in October 2013 encompassing a wide range of initiatives for embedding sustainability across the university community.

=== Green Gown ===
In 2015 the guild was a finalist when it entered the prestigious Green Gown Awards from the Environmental Association for Universities and Colleges (EAUC). The guild was highly commended by the judges receiving special mention at the awards dinner. Three interrelated themes of Education, Engagement and Outreach were driven by three members of staff and included student leadership at each stage of the award. The total student engagements through the project exceeded 5,000 out of a target of 2,000 and included:

A total of 151 trained student leaders were recruited (30 Bee keepers, 26 Gardeners, 38 Seed Fund team members, 34 Curriculum Researchers, 16 Student Switch Off Ambassadors and seven Green Impact Auditors) Some were employed to support curriculum research through surveys and leading focus groups on ESD. We worked with a cross-institutional working group to formulate recommendations on ESD now approved for implementation by the Student Experience Committee.

=== Green Schools ===
Green Schools is part of Liverpool Guild of Students ‘Green Guild’ project, in which students lead on community outreach. Student volunteers deliver fun and interactive sessions on a variety of sustainability issues and help schools to develop a 'sustainable social enterprise project' in their community.

School teams visit the guild located at the heart of the university campus for a day to plan their project, pitch their ideas to each other and receive a small grant towards their project. The university’s students inspire a younger generation to live sustainably, with themed lessons worked into the curriculum and workshops on project management skills.

From collection drives for project materials to making bird feeders or upcycled products, Green Schools offers support to schools so they can showcase their green project, take part in fundraising and spread ideas for greener living among the community in various areas of Merseyside.

== Media ==
LGSM
- Liverpool Guild Student Media
- Predecessor: Guild Gazette; XSLive, ICON Radio, LSRadio
- Established: November 19, 2019; 6 years ago
- Type: Student Society
- Purpose: Reporting and commenting on matters that are affecting students and providing scrutiny of the University and the Guild
- Location: Liverpool
- Publishing Chair: Ellie Patamia
- Radio Chair: Sol Badruddin
- Podcast Chair: Mary Wilson
- TV Chair: Phoebe Lloyd
- Parent organisation: Liverpool Guild of Students
- Affiliations: Student Publication Association, Student Radio Association
- Website: liverpoolguildstudentmedia.co.uk

=== Liverpool Guild Student Media ===
The Liverpool Guild of Students once published the Liverpool Student newspaper, which was a joint publication with the Liverpool Guild of Students and the Liverpool Hope Students' Union, until it closed down in May 2007 because of increasing costs and declining advertising revenues. Shortly after, in 2007, the Guild produced its own official publication, Sphinx magazine, referring to the original student publication of the Guild established in 1893. Sphinx itself folded by the start of September 2008 due to rising costs and a lack of advertising revenue. However, the paper was revived online in 2015 with Natasha Kondrashova and Matthjn ew Jaffa as Editors.

New editors Tom Marchant and Kelly Barnett took over in 2016/17 and enjoyed a substantial increase in popularity and circulation, winning 'Biggest Impact on University Campus' in 2017, increasing the Sphinx's impact in university community.

In September 2019, all student media groups merged to form Liverpool Guild Student Media (LGSM). LGSM was launched by Beth Ure (the first secretary), with publishing led by Hannah Percival and Radio by Maddy Walker. LGSM also introduced a video service as LGSMTV, led by Gabriel Morris.

Branch leaders in each academic year
	Secretary	Publishing		Radio	TV	Podcasts
2019-20	Beth Ure	Hannah Percival	Unknown	Maddy Walker	Gabriel Morris	Not yet established
2020-21	Lorna Farrell	Saara Rasul	Angus Watts	Shauna Page	Luke Norton	Not yet established
2021-22	Unknown	Bryony Lainton	Olivia Bennett	Adam Nadeem	Unknown	Josh
2022-23	Ashley Dempsey	Bryony Lainton	Anna Jackson	Harry James	Iona Davis	Unknown
2023-24	Unknown	Holly Anne-Hartley	Unknown	James Dolan	Unknown	Unknown
2024-25	Unknown	Flora Day	Unknown	James Dolan	Unknown	Mary Wilson
2025-26	'Unknown'	Ellie Patamia	Unknown	Sol Badruddin	Phoebe Lloyd	Mary Wilson

==== Publishing ====
In 2008, although not officially organised by the Guild, Sphinx magazine was eventually replaced with the web based venture, LSMedia (Liverpool Student Media). In 2011, under editor Matt Healy, LSMedia was shortlisted for a Guardian Student Media award under the category "Website of the Year". In 2012, the website was redesigned under editor Dani Telford and as readership grew, LSMedia decided to revive the print edition with a special one-off "The Sphinx" Newspaper paying homage to the society's origins. In late 2015, under direct guild supervision, LSMedia as a society folded due to a lack of student interest, being replaced by a new online version of The Sphinx student publication. Ellipsis magazine was the only print edition at the university until 2018 when The Sphinx released its own print newspaper under editors Jess Molyneux and Heather Fallon, as a result of increased membership and funding from the Student Union. From 2019, The Sphinx continued under the name of Liverpool Guild Student Media.

After the 2019–20 academic year, it was decided that, as the largest branch, the publishing chair role should be split into two Co-Chairs. In 2020, Saara Rasul and Angus Watts were elected.

==== Radio ====
The guild is also home to a radio, student-run, internet radio station. The society was founded in 1961 as the Liverpool Amateur Radio Society by a radio enthusiast group, that broadcast under the callsign 'G3OUL'. The radio station is alleged to be one of the oldest student radio stations in the UK. The station in its lifespan has gone under many different identities, including XSLive (1998–2002) and ICON Radio (2002–2011), LSRadio (2011–2019), and was rebranded as Liverpool Guild Student Media in September 2019.

LGSM is currently available online, via the LGSM website. Notable alumni include BBC Radio 1's Nick Grimshaw, Marcus Stead, editor of Snooker Scene magazine and Talksport radio pundit, Tulip Mazumdar from BBC News, Peter Ruddick, the BBC Breakfast business presenter, and Hannah Colson from the Ministry of Sound. LGSM is a registered member of the Student Radio Association.

In 2020, Shauna Page was elected as chair.

==== TV ====
In 2019, TV was included into the LGSM network led by Gabriel Morris. The first year brought a series of student-led productions, including the Green Guild. As of June 2021, the branch has been headed by Luke Norton.

== Liverpool Medical Students Society ==
In November 2014, an investigation was launched into the activities of the Liverpool Medical Students' Society, following the release of a script for the annual 'Smoker' event, causing public controversy. In January 2016, the Liverpool Guild of Students in conjunction with the University of Liverpool decided to de-ratify the LMSS, and prohibit all activities and communication in official matters claiming, "Deadlines for engaging with an action plan were extended on three occasions, but despite our best efforts, this action plan was not delivered." The LMSS responded, stating that its members had been threatened with formal 'Fitness to Practice' investigations if they did not co-operate, a claim refuted by the guild. In response to the controversy, a Change.org petition was mounted, calling for the resignation of the Liverpool Guild of Students' then President, Harry Anderson, for "isolating the LMSS's 1,500 students". As of 21 January 2016, this petition had 1,300 signatures.
