= Non pro nobis laboramus =

Non pro nobis laboramus (Latin for "we labor not for ourselves") is the motto of the Vermont Historical Society, the Vermont Medical Society, and the Liverpool Medical Students Society, which is part of the University of Liverpool, a red brick university in the United Kingdom.
