= Clark Rampling =

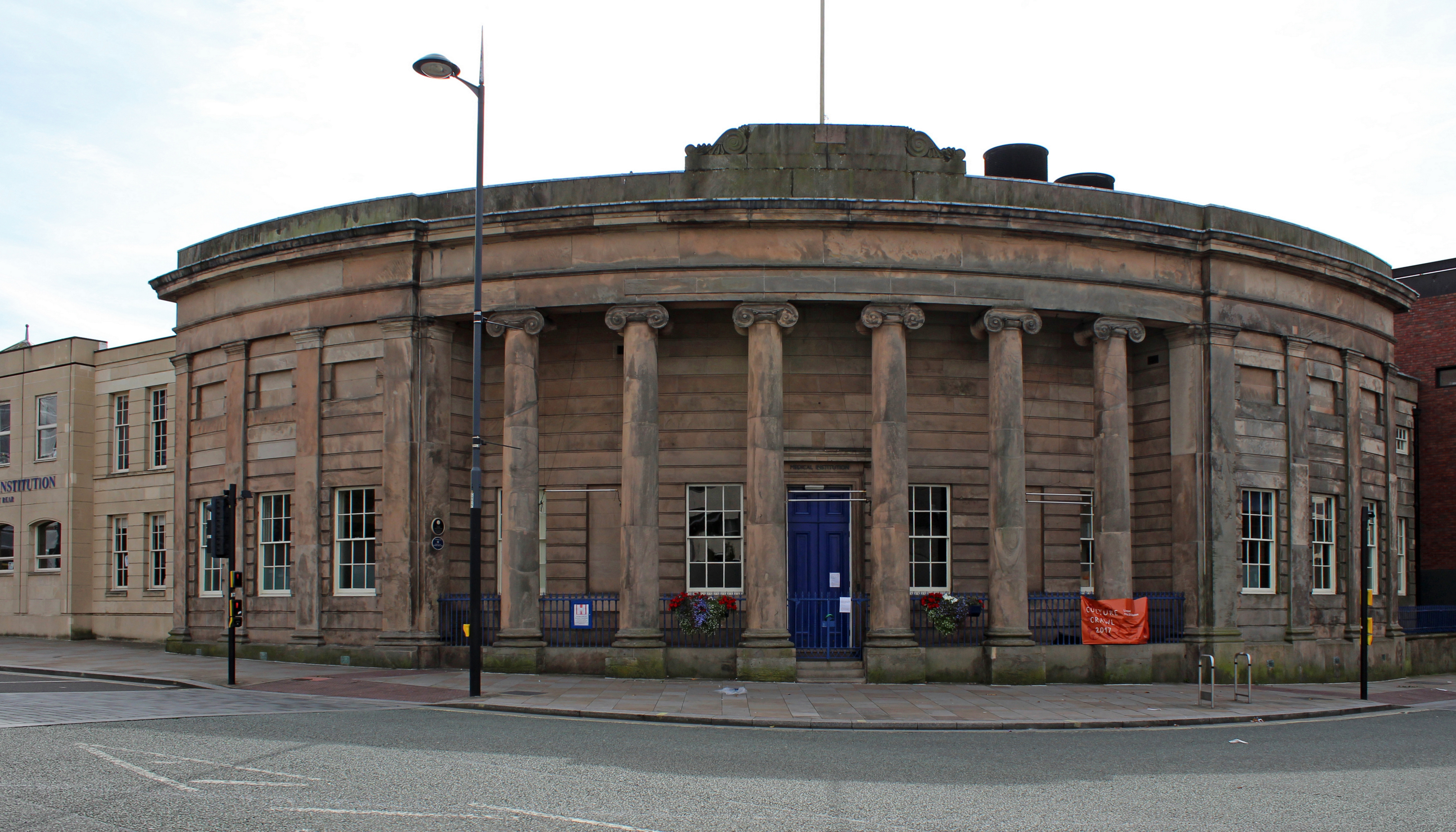
Liverpool Medical Institution

Clark Rampling (bapt 6 April 1793 – buried 7 March 1875) was an English architect who worked from offices in London and from about 1820 in Birkenhead, Cheshire (now in Merseyside). By 1841 he was joined in partnership in Birkenhead by his nephew Robert Bushell Rampling and the practice was known as C. and R. B. Rampling.

His best known work is the Liverpool Medical Institution, which was built in 1835–37 in Neoclassical style. This building is recorded in the National Heritage List for England as a designated Grade II* listed building. Earlier, he had designed the Church of St Mary, Birch, a Commissioners' church in Gothic Revival style, (c. 1827/28) which has since been demolished. Other works in Cheshire and Lancashire include

- 1832 Villas at Mill Bank, Nr. West Derby
- 1833/35 Birkenhead Town Hall
- 1834 House for Spencer Jones, West Derby
- 1837 The Fish Hall, Murray Street, Liverpool
- 1830/40 Estate cottages, Caldy, West Kirby
- 1840 Magistrates' offices, Birkenhead
- 1840 St John the Evangelist, Buglawton, Congleton
- 1845 Market etc., Birkenhead

Clark Rampling died in 1875 in Tranmere, which is now in Merseyside.
