= Linda de Cossart =

English vascular surgeon

Linda de Cossart CBE is an English general surgeon who specialises in vascular surgery. She is the director of medical education at the Countess of Chester Hospital.

== Biography ==
Linda de Cossart graduated from the University of Liverpool School of Medicine in 1972 and was admitted as a fellow of the Royal College of Surgeons of England (RCS) in 1978. At the time, there were few female surgeons; de Cossart has said that "women were actively discouraged from going into surgery". After obtaining her surgical fellowship, she completed a Master of Surgery at the University of Liverpool with a thesis on venous disease. While performing research for her thesis, she developed sarcoidosis. In 1988, she was appointed by the Countess of Chester Hospital as a consultant general surgeon and was tasked with establishing a specialised service for peripheral vascular surgery at the hospital. She retired from surgery in 2009, and remains an emeritus consultant and the director of medical education at the Countess of Chester Hospital.

De Cossart was elected to the RCS council in 1999 and was elected vice president of the college in 2008. Her portrait was featured in a 2008 exhibition titled "Six Women Surgeons" at the RCS's London building. She was appointed a CBE in 2010 and is an honorary professor at the University of Chester.

De Cossart is a frequent collaborator of Della Fish. Together, they established a master's degree programme in Postgraduate Medical Practice at the University of Chester, and they have co-authored three books aimed at doctors: Cultivating a Thinking Surgeon (2005), Developing the Wise Doctor (2007) and Reflection for Medical Appraisal (2013).
