= Vermont Medical Society =

American professional organization for physicians

- Seal of the Vermont Medical Society, with the motto non pro nobis laboramus
- Founded: November 6, 1813; 212 years ago
- Type: professional organization
- Legal status: 501(c)(6)
- Headquarters: Montpelier, Vermont, U.S.
- Coordinates: 44.2617899°N 72.5769966°W
- Region served: Vermont
- Members: approximately 2,000
- Executive Director: Jessa Barnard
- President: Ryan Sexton
- Employees: 8 (2019)
- Website: vtmd.org
- Formerly called: Vermont State Medical Society

The Vermont Medical Society is the professional organization for physicians in the U.S. state of Vermont. Founded in 1813, the organization provides service to physicians in the form of information and lobbies the Vermont General Assembly on regulatory issues affecting its membership.
