= Liverpool Medical Institution =

Historic medical organisation in England

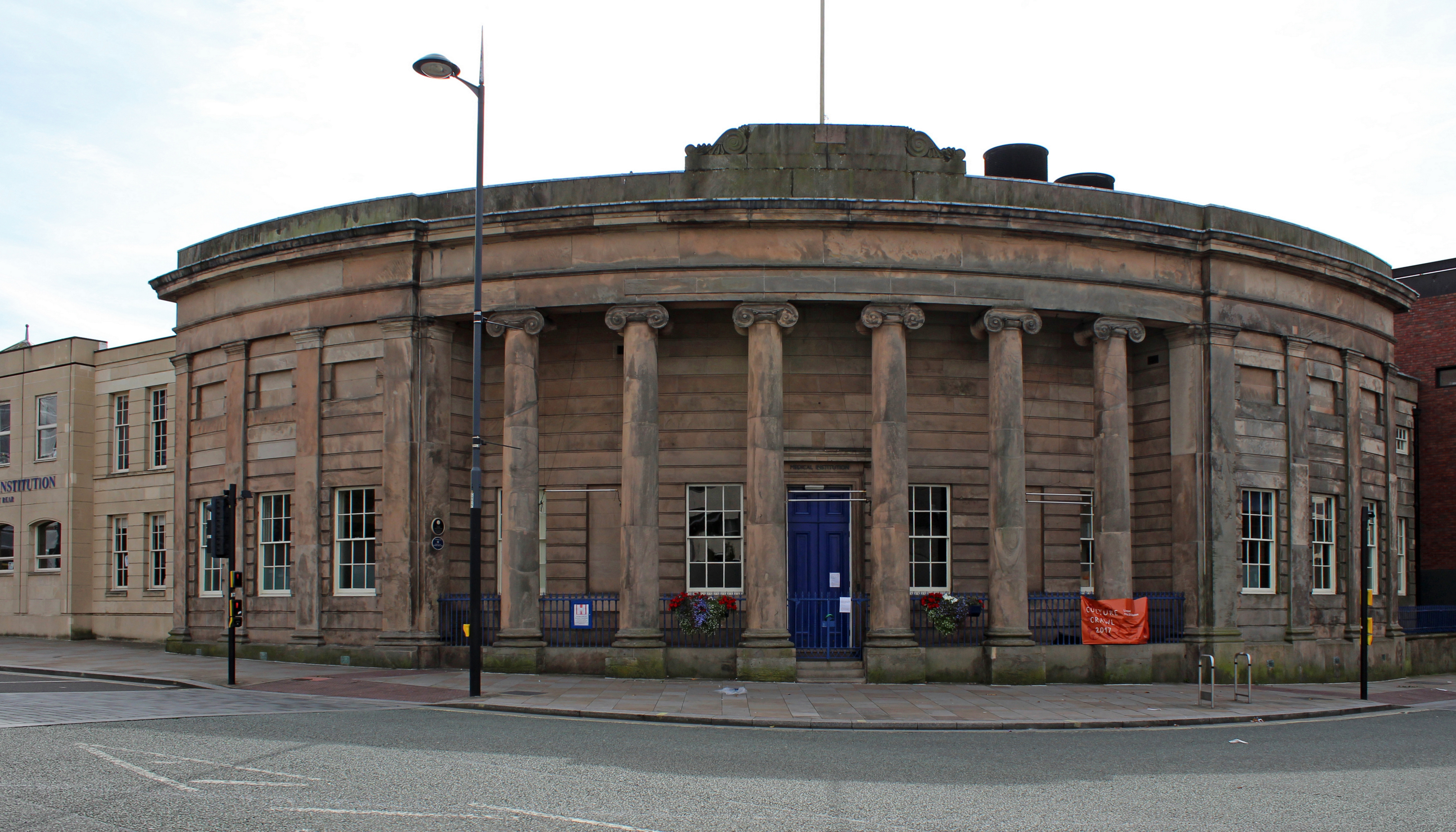
- The building in 2017

General information
- Architectural style: Greek Revival
- Location: Mount Pleasant and Hope Street, Liverpool, England
- Coordinates: 53.4033°N 2.9692°W
- Year built: 1837
- Client: Liverpool Medical Institution

Design and construction
- Architect: Clark Rampling
- Designations

Listed Building – Grade II*
- Official name: Liverpool Medical Institution
- Designated: 28 June 1952
- Reference no.: 1208429

The Liverpool Medical Institution is a historic medical organisation based in Liverpool, England. Its building on the corner of Mount Pleasant and Hope Street was opened in 1837, but the site has been used as a medical library since 1779.

== History ==
The building is on the site of a former inn and a bowling green, which was the birthplace of the businessman and amateur scientist William Roscoe. In 1779 a group of local doctors created the Liverpool Medical Library. In 1833 the Liverpool Medical Society was formed. The two societies merged as the Liverpool Medical Institution, and commissioned Clark Rampling to design a building to house it. The building cost £4,000 (equivalent to £480,000 in 2023), and was opened in 1837. In 1907 the Council Room was remodelled by Edmund Rathbone. The society was incorporated under a Royal Charter in 1964. An extension was added to the building in 1966. In 1998 a major refurbishment of the building took place.

The Liverpool Medical Institution is recorded in the National Heritage List for England as a designated Grade II* listed building.

== Architecture ==
The building is constructed in stone, and presents a curved façade to Mount Pleasant and Hope Street. Its architectural style is Greek Revival. It has 16 bays. The lateral three bays on each side are recessed and have two storeys; the rest of the building is single-storeyed. The central seven bays form a recessed entrance behind six unfluted Ionic columns. Elsewhere the bays are divided by pilasters. The windows are sash windows. Along the top of the building is a cornice. Inside is a central hall, a lecture theatre, a library, a museum, and meeting rooms, all lit from above by glazed domes.

== Present day ==
The institution "exists to foster an environment for furthering medical and health education and knowledge". It organises lectures and social events, runs a library, and hosts meetings of the Liverpool Medical History Society, which was founded in 1984. It is a registered charity, and hosts the Mersey branches of the Royal College of Physicians and Royal College of General Practitioners of Great Britain. The institution also contains a historic library, available to members and researchers, which includes an archive of rare medical books and manuscripts from the 16th century.

A portrait of Dr Richard Caton hangs in the institution, who founded the forerunner to the Liverpool Medical Students Society, known as The Liverpool Royal Infirmary School of Medicine Debating Society (M.S.D.S.) in 1874.

Liverpool Medical Institution: Architecture, notable individuals and interior
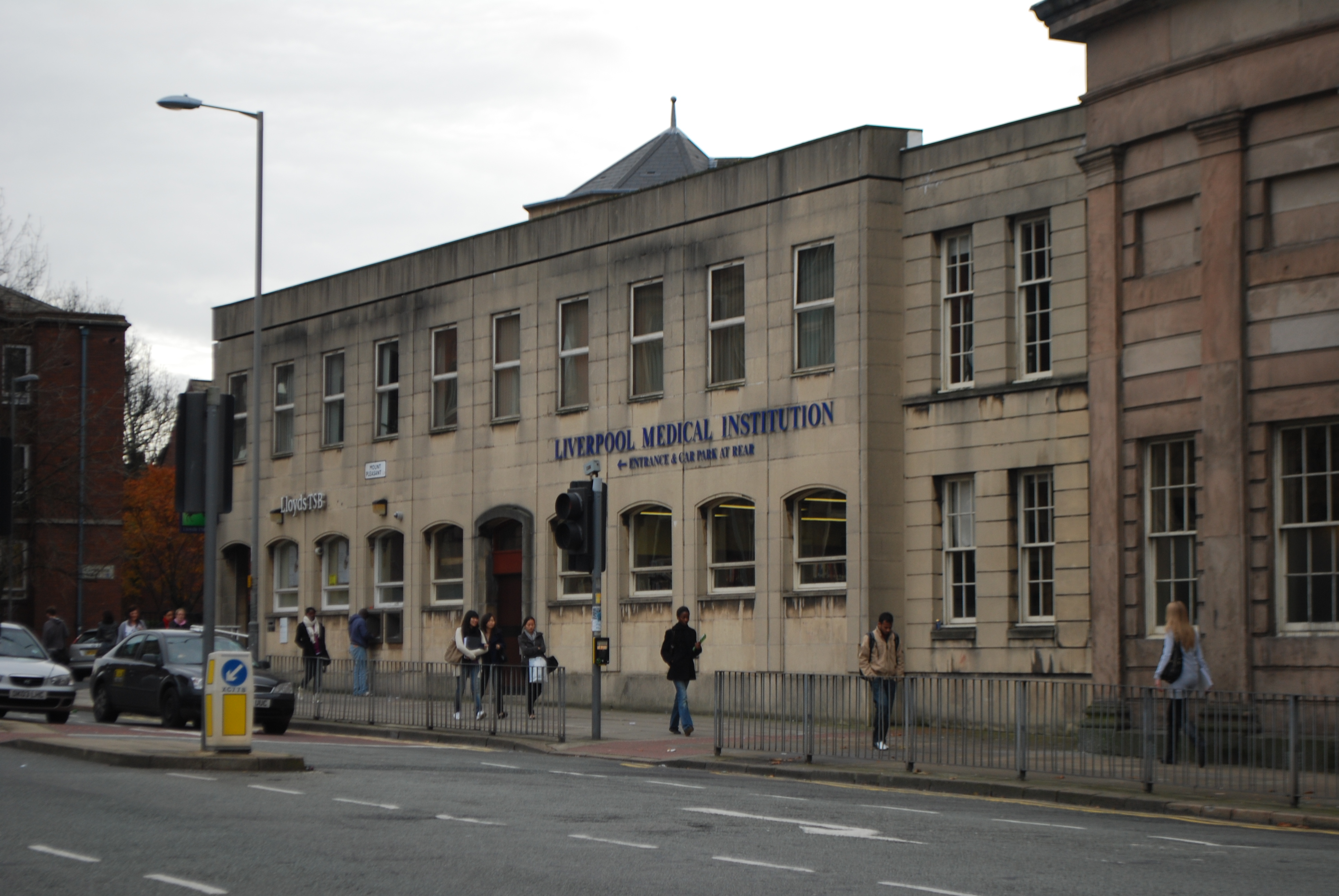
Modern extension of Liverpool Medical Institution, shown from Mount Pleasant

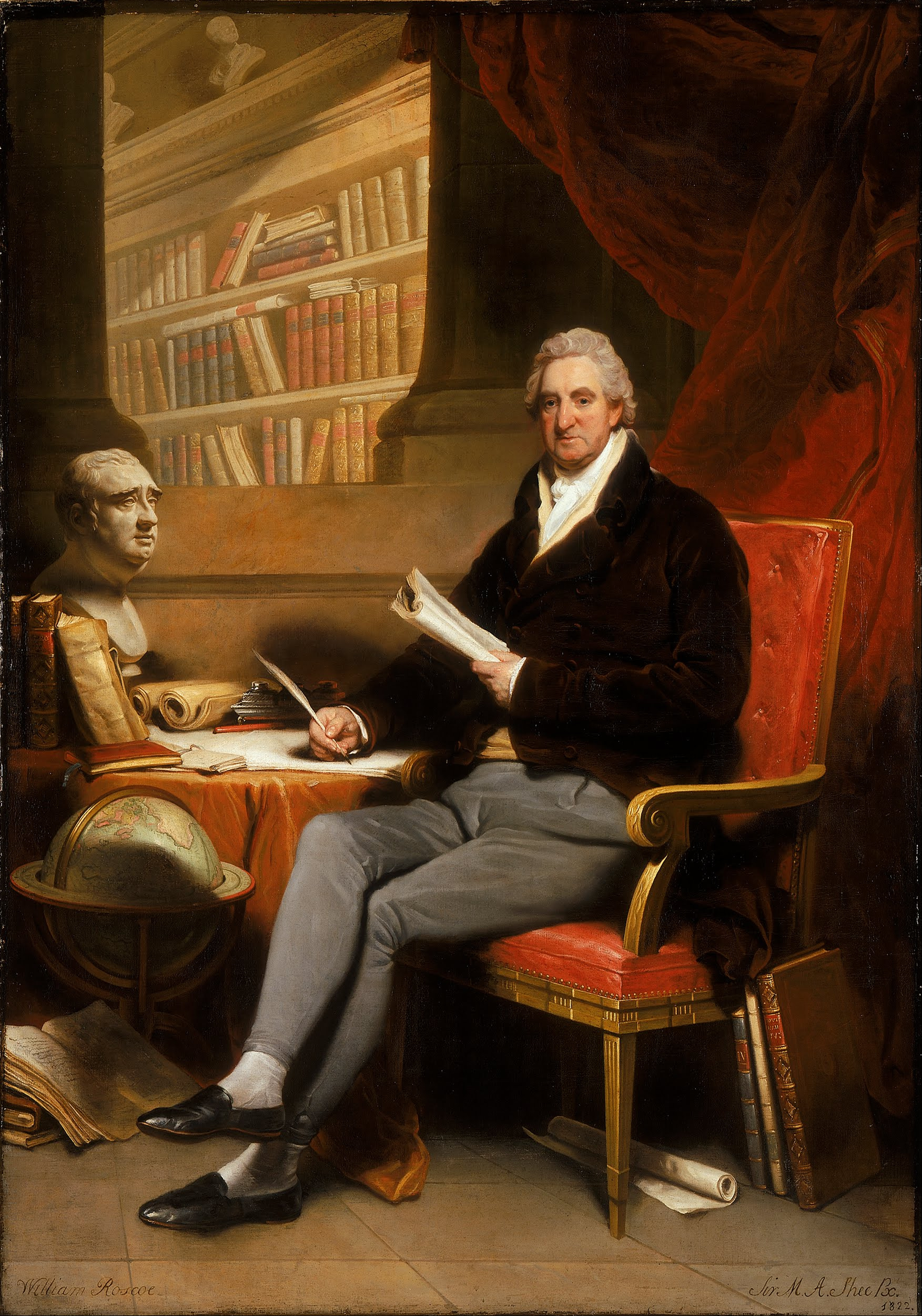
William Roscoe (1753–1831) born at the Bowling Green public house on the site now occupied by the Liverpool Medical Institution

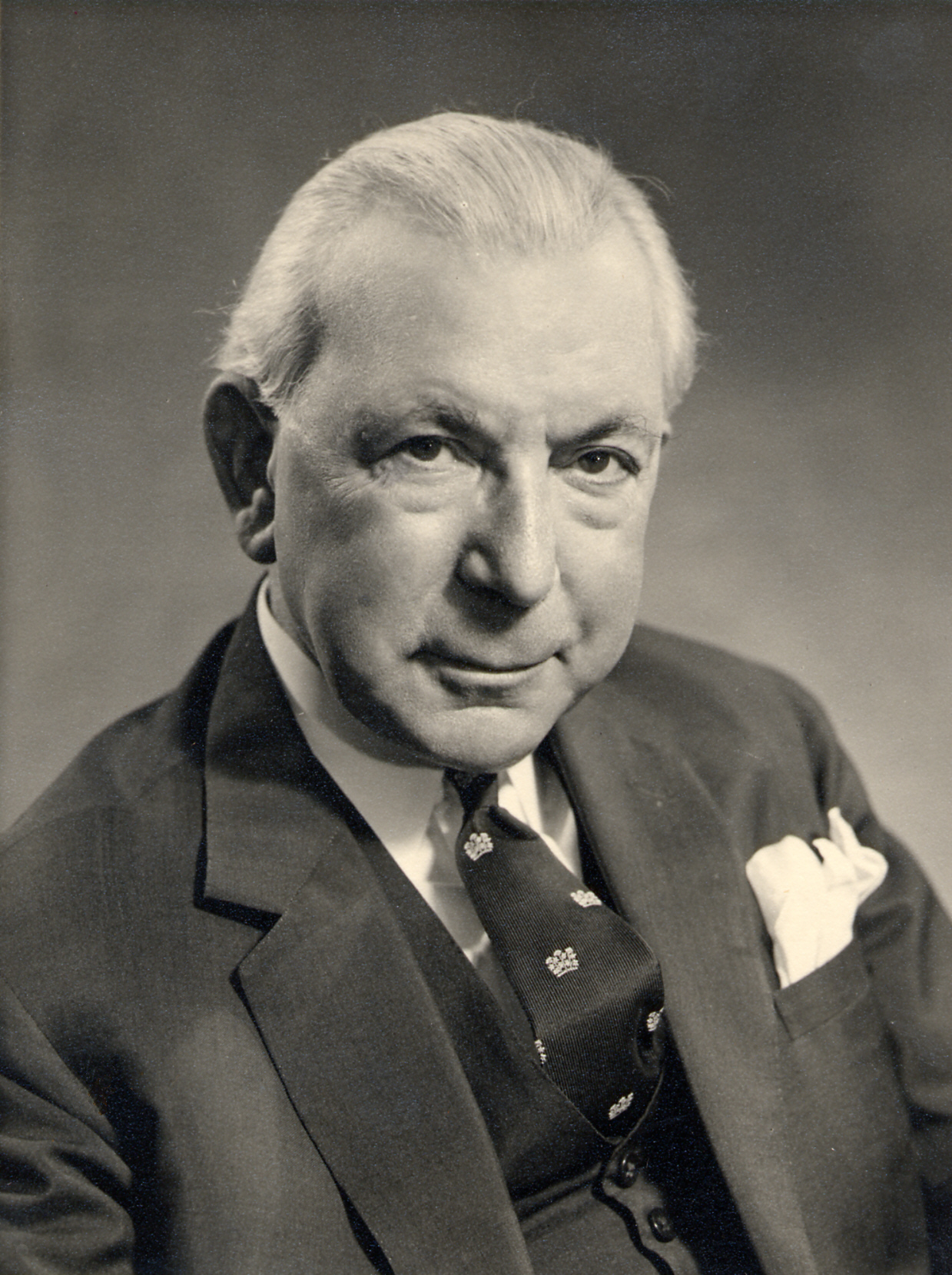
Henry Cohen, 1st Baron Cohen of Birkenhead, president of the Liverpool Medical Institution for the year 1954

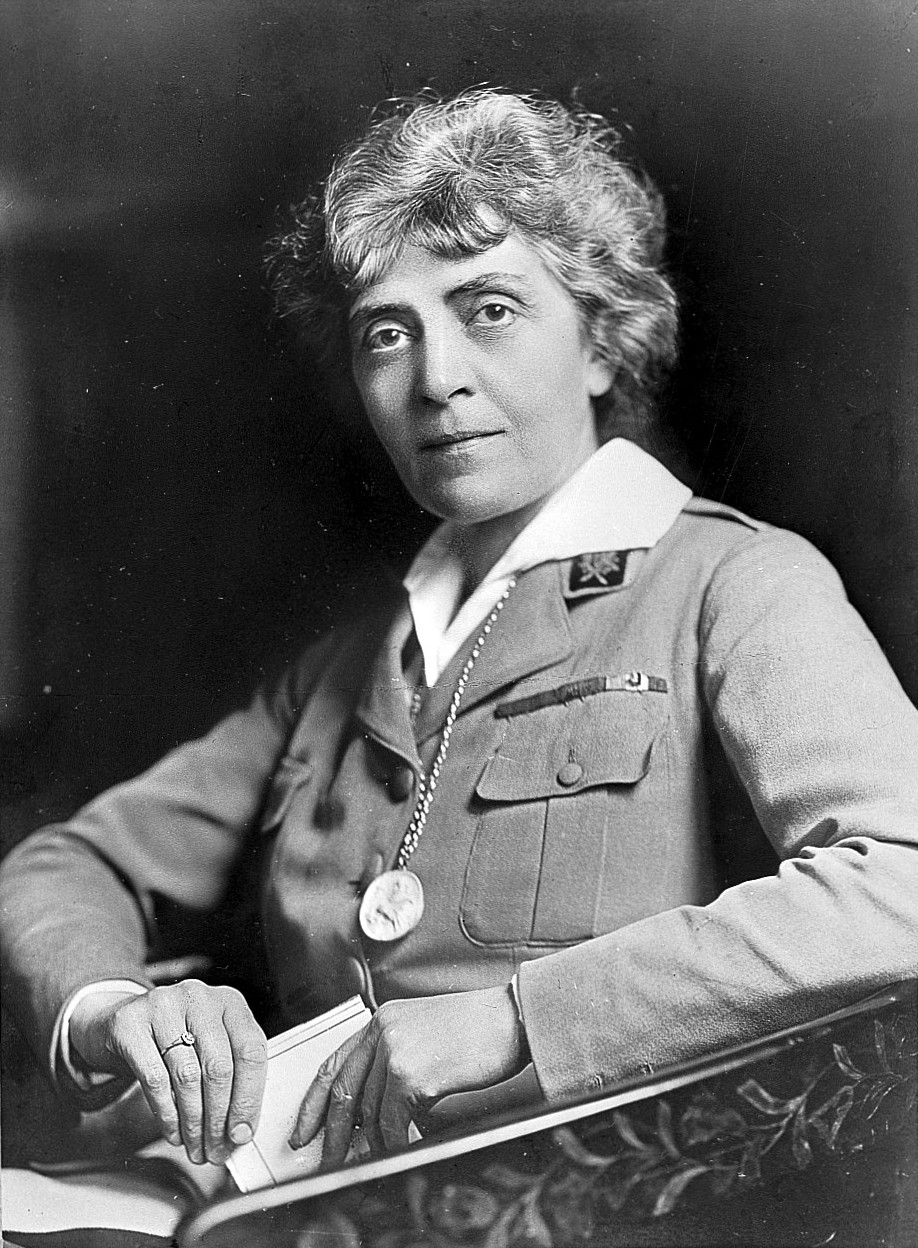
Frances Ivens, first female vice-president of the Liverpool Medical Institution, 1926

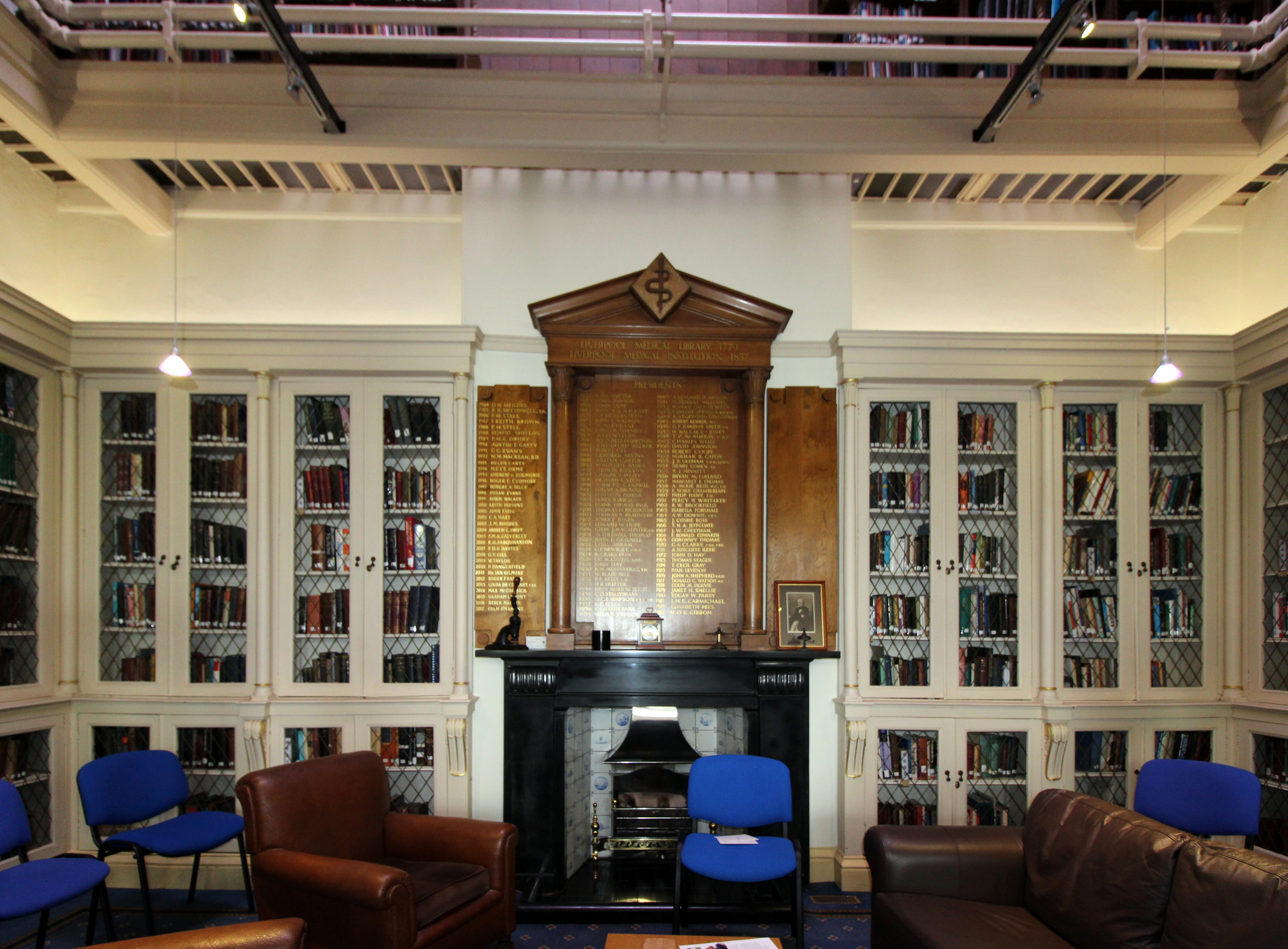
The institution's library

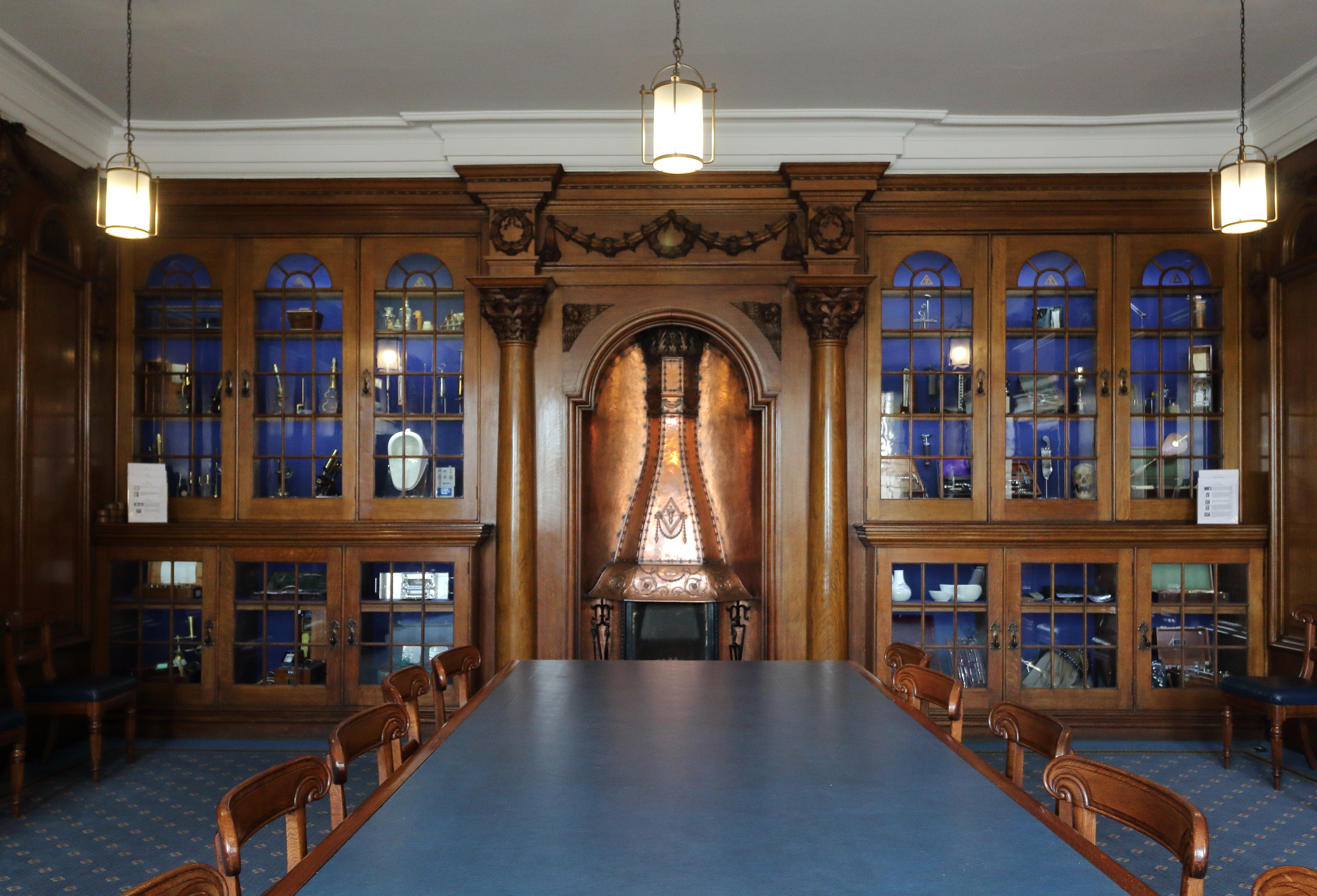
The Council Room

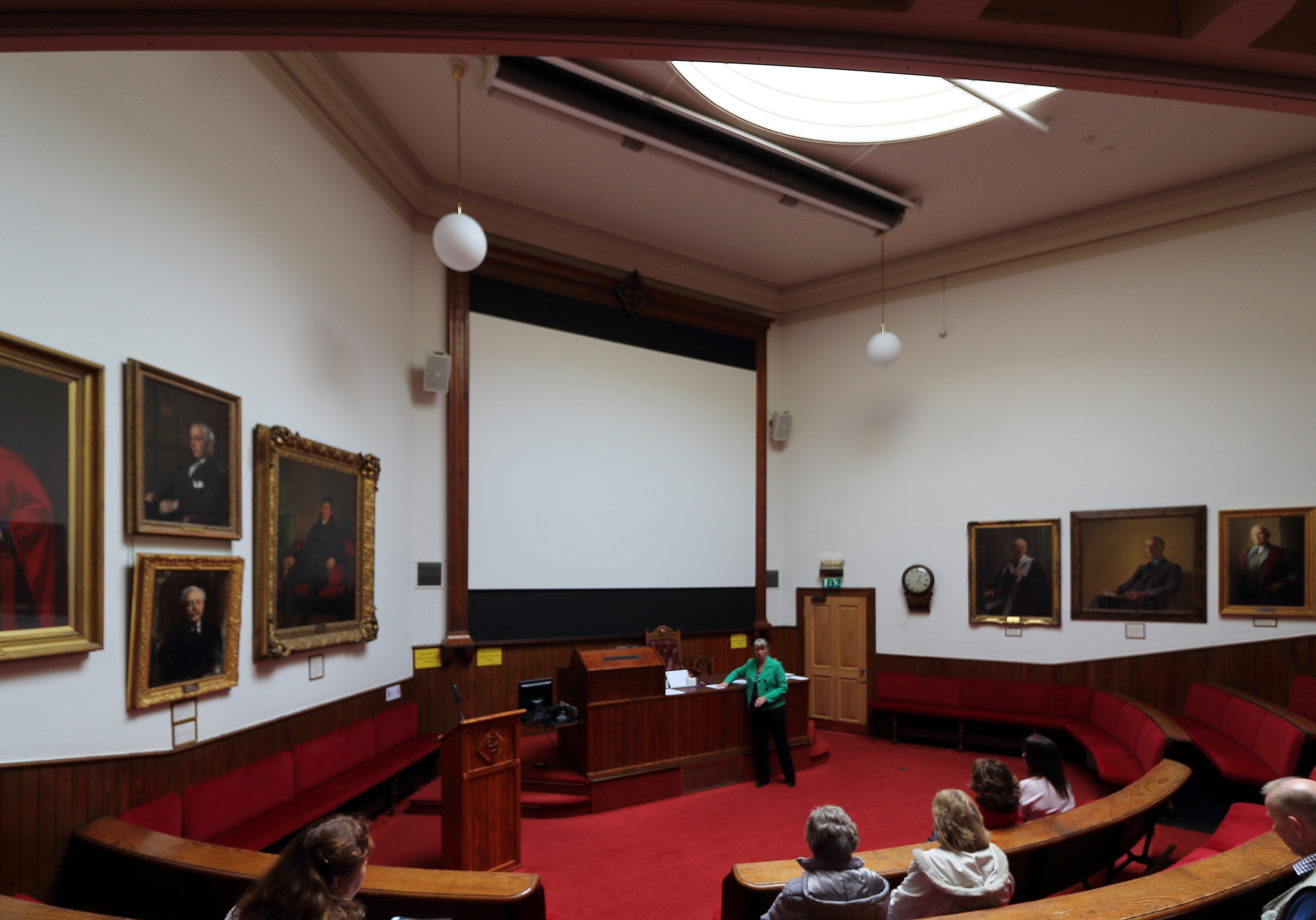
The Lecture Theatre

== See also ==
- Architecture of Liverpool
- Grade II* listed buildings in Liverpool – City Centre
- Healthcare in Liverpool
- Liverpool Medical Students Society
- University of Liverpool School of Medicine
