= Averil Mansfield =

British surgeon and academic

Dame Averil Mansfield DBE FRCS FRCP
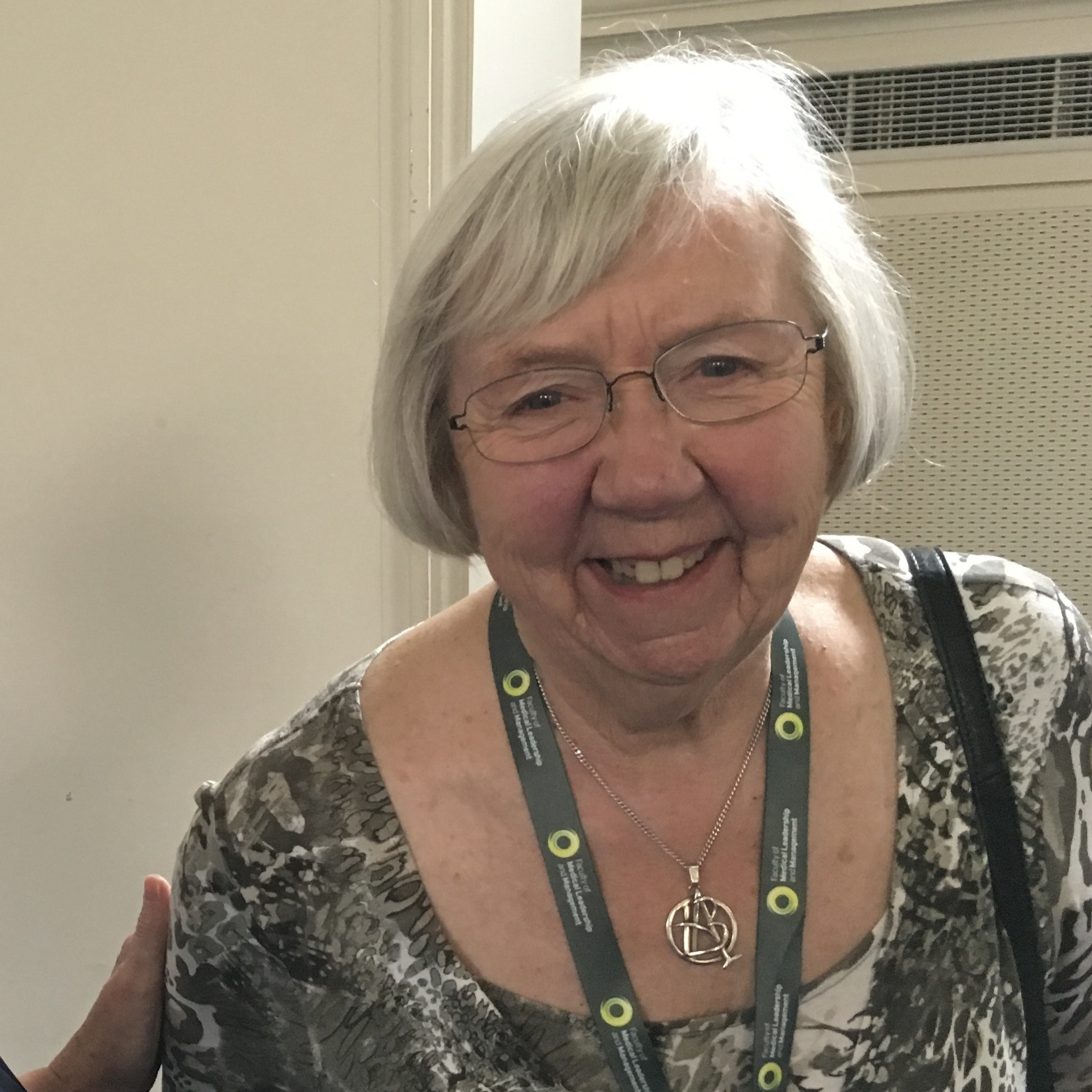
- Mansfield in 2017
- Born: Averil Olive Mansfield; 21 June 1937 (age 88); Blackpool
- Citizenship: UK
- Education: Blackpool Collegiate School for Girls, University of Liverpool School of Medicine
- Occupation: Surgeon
- Known for: First British woman to be appointed a professor of surgery. President of the British Medical Association (2009-2010).
- Medical career
- Institutions: St Mary's Hospital
- Sub-specialties: Vascular surgery

Dame Averil Olive Bradley (née Mansfield; born 21 June 1937), known professionally as Averil Mansfield, is a retired English vascular surgeon. She was a consultant surgeon at St Mary's Hospital in Paddington, central London, from 1982 to 2002, and in 1993 she became the first British woman to be appointed a professor of surgery.

== Early life ==
Averil Olive Mansfield was born in 1937 in Blackpool. Her mother suffered deep vein thrombosis and a pulmonary embolism during her difficult birth, which later influenced Mansfield's specialism in her medical career. She wanted to become a surgeon from the age of eight, after being inspired by a children's book about advances in surgery. She was educated at Blackpool Collegiate School for Girls and went on to attend the University of Liverpool School of Medicine, gaining a Bachelor of Medicine in 1960.

== Career ==
Mansfield began her career at the Royal Liverpool University Hospital, and became a consultant vascular surgeon there in 1972 and later a lecturer in surgery at the University of Liverpool. She then moved to London in 1980 to work at Hillingdon Hospital. Two years later, she was appointed by St Mary's Hospital in Paddington as a consultant vascular surgeon. She was an honorary senior lecturer at St Mary's Hospital Medical School, which merged with the Imperial College School of Medicine in 1988. She remained at St Mary's for the rest of her career, while also serving as an honorary consultant in pediatric and vascular surgery at Great Ormond Street Hospital.

In 1991, Mansfield was the founding chairwoman of the RCS's Women in Surgical Training committee. In 1993, she was made a professor of vascular surgery at St Mary's Hospital, making her the first female professor of surgery in the United Kingdom.

Mansfield retired from surgery in 2002. She was made a Fellow of the Royal College of Physicians (FRCP) in 2005, and was elected president of the British Medical Association in 2009–10. In 2012, she was voted one of "100 Women Who Have Changed the World" by The Independent on Sunday. She founded Women in Surgery, a Royal College of Surgeons initiative to encourage more women to enter the field. In May 2018, she received the NHS Heroes Award.

Mansfield was appointed Commander of the Order of the British Empire (CBE) in the 1999 New Year Honours for services to surgery and women in medicine. She was promoted to Dame Commander of the Order of the British Empire (DBE) in the 2023 Birthday Honours for services to surgery and equality in medicine.

== Personal life ==
Mansfield married John William Paulton "Jack" Bradley, a fellow surgeon, in 1987. He died in 2013. On 18 October 2020, she was interviewed as the castaway on Radio 4's Desert Island Discs, selecting a book of poetry, a grand piano, and Brahms' Piano Concerto No. 2 in B Flat, Andante (Piu adagio), conducted by Andris Nelsons and performed by Hélène Grimaud with the Vienna Philharmonic as her chosen favourite book, luxury item and record respectively.
