= William Gill (surgeon) =

British surgeon and philanthropist in the Cape Colony (1795–1863)

- Born: 1795; Market Harborough, Leicestershire, England
- Died: 14 September 1863 (aged 67–68); Somerset East, Cape Colony
- Occupations: Surgeon, naturalist, philanthropist
- Known for: Bequest that founded Gill College

William Gill (1795 – 14 September 1863) was a British-born surgeon and naturalist who practiced in the Cape Colony. He is best known for the large bequest in his will that established Gill College in Somerset East (today KwaNojoli), one of the older educational institutions in the Eastern Cape province of South Africa.

== Early life and training ==
Gill was born in Market Harborough, Leicestershire, in 1795 to the Reverend George Gill and his wife (name unknown). He started work in Wellingborough, Northamptonshire in 1810 as a medical apprentice to Thomas Peck, under whom he was indentured for five years, subsequently studying medicine at the University of Glasgow. He became a member of the Royal College of Surgeons of England in 1817 and a licentiate of the Society of Apothecaries in 1818. He spent a year travelling in continental Europe, during which he developed a lasting interest in botany.

== Career in the Cape Colony ==
Gill arrived at the Cape Colony in June 1818 and was licensed to practise as a surgeon, obstetrician and pharmacist later that year. He initially served as the district surgeon at Caledon and later settled in the Zwartland district (near present-day Malmesbury) in 1822, where he was noted for his work during a typhoid outbreak.

In 1826 he undertook an expedition northward for hunting and natural-history collecting, reaching as far as Kuruman, where he met the explorer and geologist Andrew Geddes Bain. He suffered heavy losses when his wagons were destroyed and returned to Cape Town in 1827, before trekking inland again. Around 1830 he collected plant and shell fossils along the Sundays River near Uitenhage.

On the recommendation of Dr James Barry and the Reverend George Thom, Gill was appointed district surgeon of the newly established settlement of Somerset (later Somerset East) in 1829 at £100 per annum. He maintained a private practice there for many years and was a respected member of the local community, with a wide circle of friends and known for his generosity. When the district surgeoncy was abolished in 1845, Gill declined an alternative appointment as resident surgeon on Robben Island, instead opting for an annual pension of £50 and continued to practice medicine in the town. He acquired a number of farms in the district and became a wealthy merino sheep farmer.

He co-founded the Somerset Reading Society in 1832 and was a member of the Literary, Scientific and Medical Society of Grahamstown. He continued to collect botanical specimens, particularly orchids, and sold approximately 400 specimens to Thom that eventually reached the Herbarium at Kew Gardens. Several plant species, including Myrsine gilliana, Aspalathus gillii (renamed Aspalathus setacea) and Erica gillii, were named after him.

== Death and legacy ==
Gill, unmarried, died of oedema on 14 September 1863 in Somerset East, aged 68. In his will dated 19 January 1863 he left the bulk of his estate, approximately £23 000, for the formation and future maintenance of a higher educational institution in the Eastern Province. Local residents raised funds for the buildings. The Gill College Corporation was formed, land was granted in 1867, and the college opened on 18 March 1869. Its architecture was modelled on that of the University of Glasgow. Originally intended as a university college, it later became a high school (from 1903) and continues today as a co-educational dual-medium school.

Gill was originally laid to rest in the town's cemetery at the foot of the Boschberg. In 1916 his remains were reinterred in front of the college, and a monument to him was erected in 1923 alongside his grave.
