= Victoria Gallery & Museum =

Art gallery and museum in Liverpool, UK

Coordinates: 53.4061°N 2.9664°W

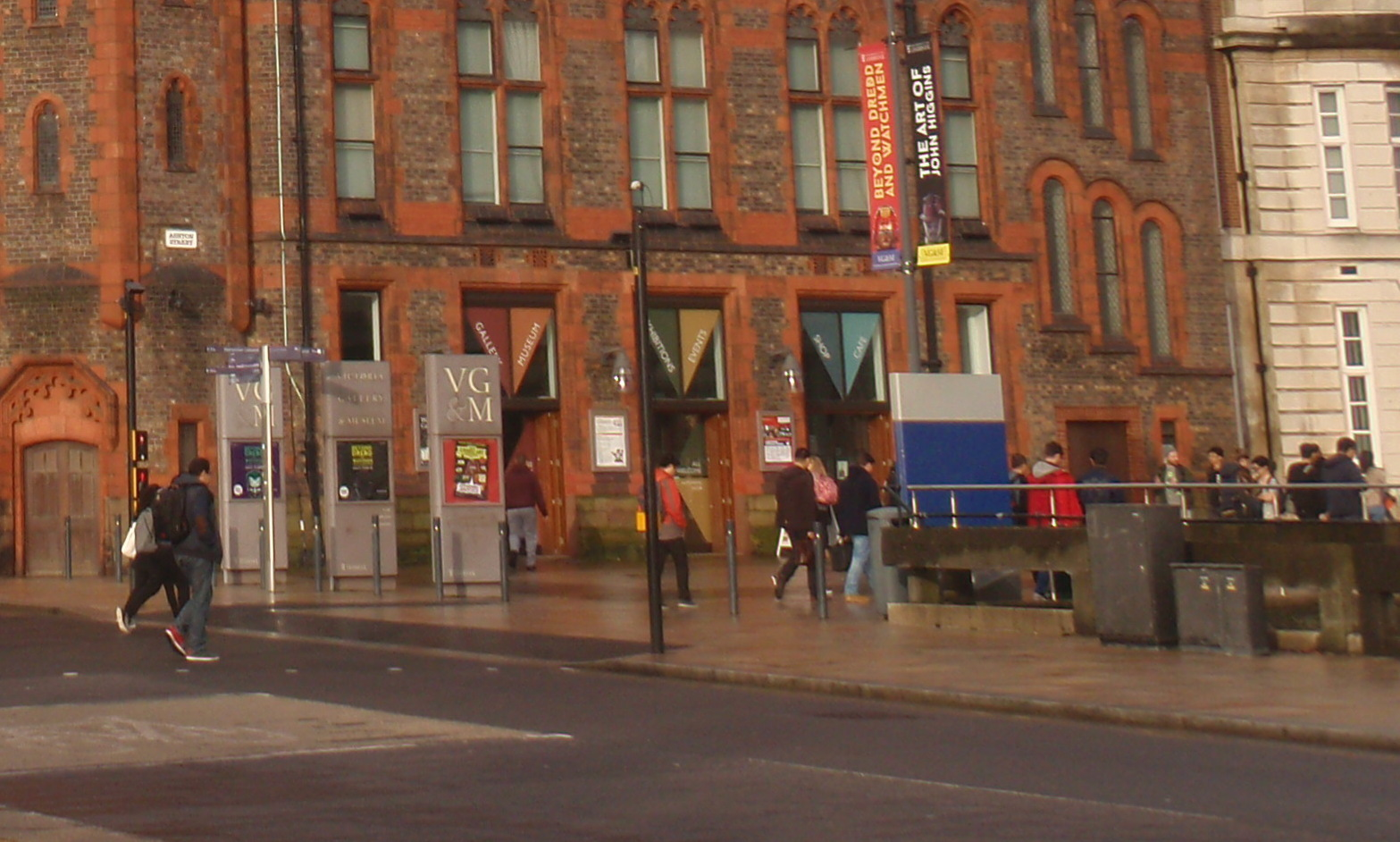
The Victoria Building, Brownlow Hill, Liverpool. Housing the Victoria Gallery and Museum.

The Victoria Gallery & Museum (VG&M) is an art gallery and museum run by the University of Liverpool in Liverpool, Merseyside, England.

VG&M is located in the "redbrick" 1892 Victoria Building. It‘s marked with “THE ORIGINAL REDBRICK” on the top of official home page. The building was designed by the Victorian architect Alfred Waterhouse and is Grade II listed. After restoration of the building at a cost of £8.6 million, the museum opened on 28 May 2008. It houses the University of Liverpool's art and museum collections, donated to and created by the university.

The museum is open to the public from Tuesday to Saturday each week and admission is free. On the ground floor is the Waterhouse Café and a shop. On the first floor is the art collection which comprises paintings, sculptures and ceramics. Artists represented include Joseph Wright of Derby, J. M. W. Turner, Jacob Epstein, Lucian Freud, Elisabeth Frink and John James Audubon. A series of special exhibitions is organised. Also on this floor is the Leggate Lecture Theatre in which educational talks are given.

== Tate Hall Museum ==
The top floor comprises the Tate Hall Museum which contains an exhibition called 'Lightbulb moments'. The display explores where great ideas come from and invites visitors to consider how they might have great ideas of their own, by identifying a problem, building on the work of others, using their creativity, and staying curious about the world. The objects are drawn from the University of Liverpool's collections and elsewhere and are on a variety of subjects, including zoology, medicine, dentistry, archaeology, engineering and oceanography.

== Gallery ==
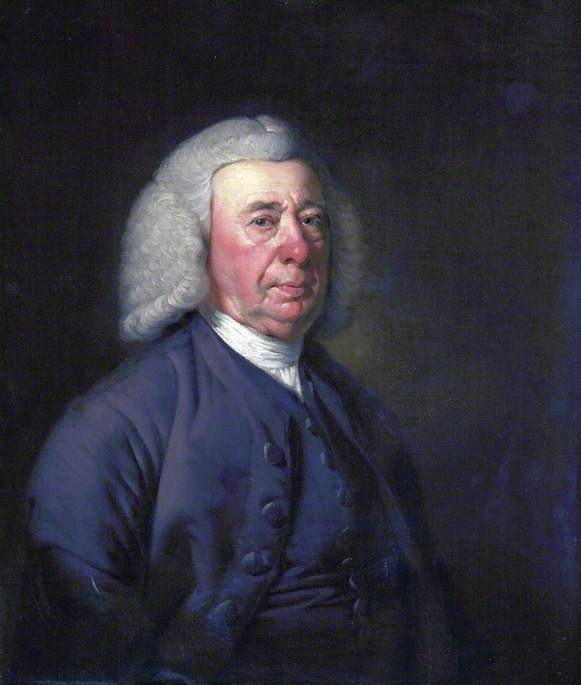
Portrait of Charles Goore by Joseph Wright of Derby

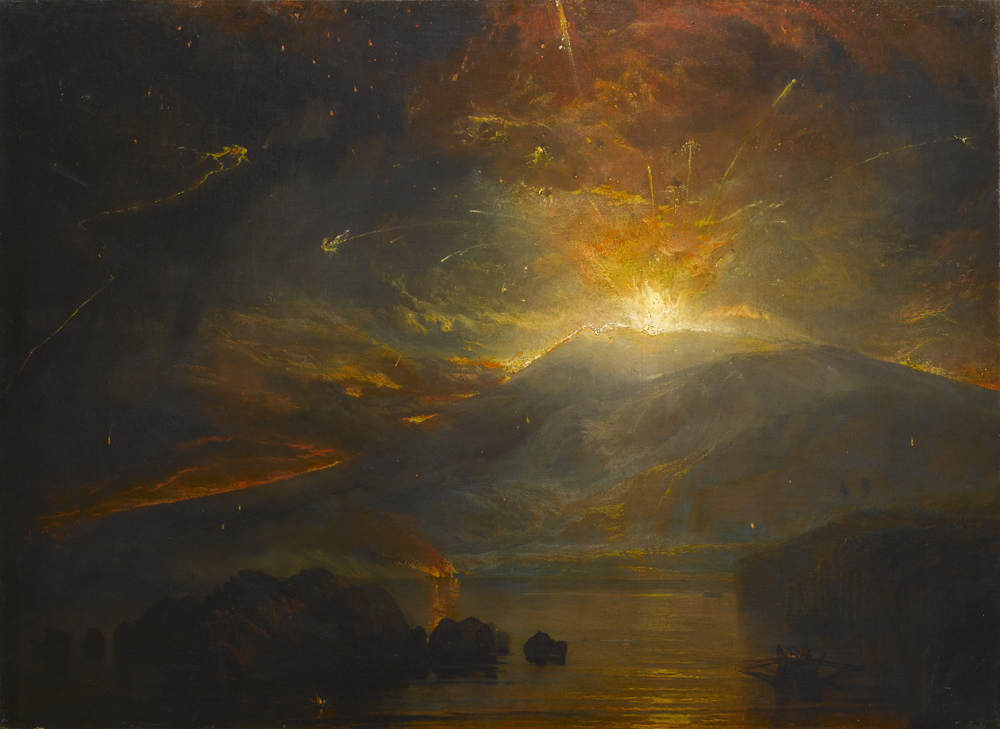
The Eruption of the Soufrière Mountains by J.M.W. Turner, 1815

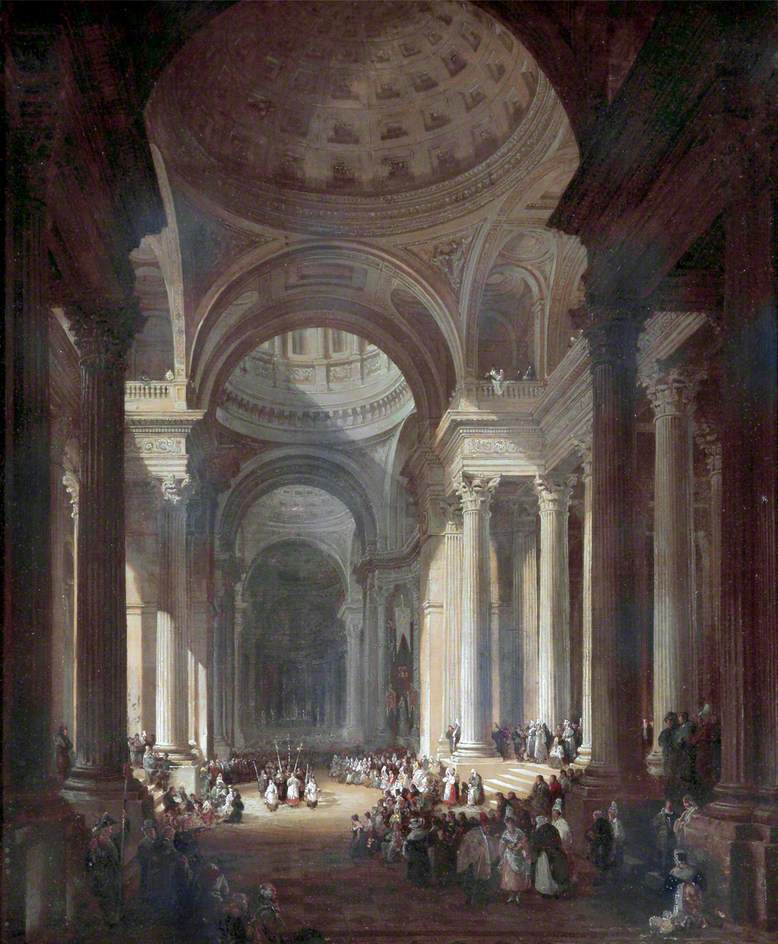
Interior of the Church of St Geneviève, Paris by David Roberts, 1826

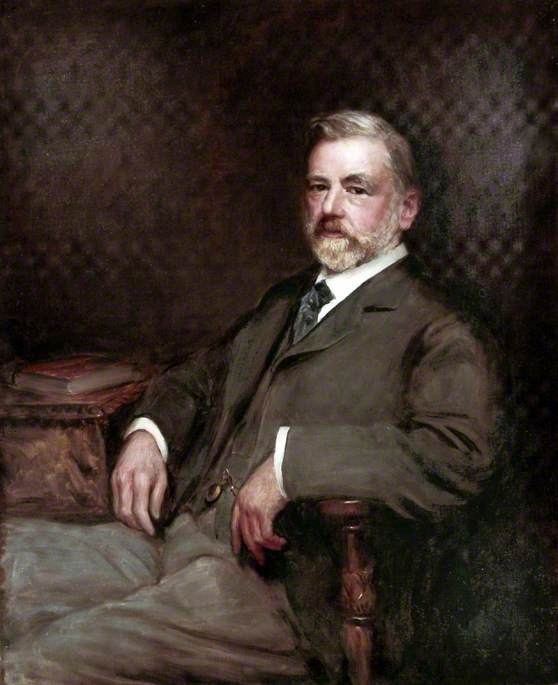
Portrait of Owen Owen by Hubert von Herkomer, 1868

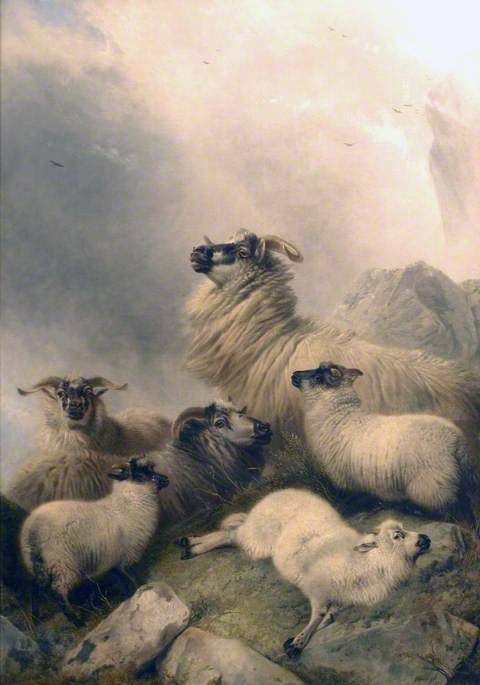
The Anxious Mother by Richard Ansdell, 1875

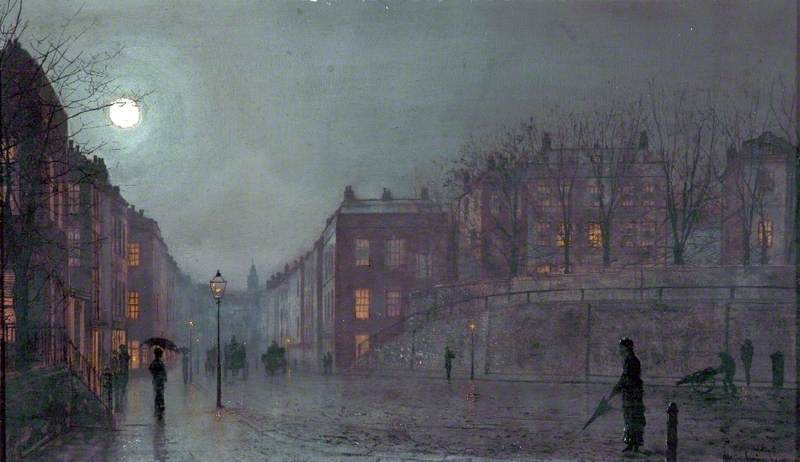
A View of Hampstead, London by John Atkinson Grimshaw, 1882
