= Victoria Building, University of Liverpool =

Grade II listed architectural structure in Liverpool, United kingdom

Victoria Building
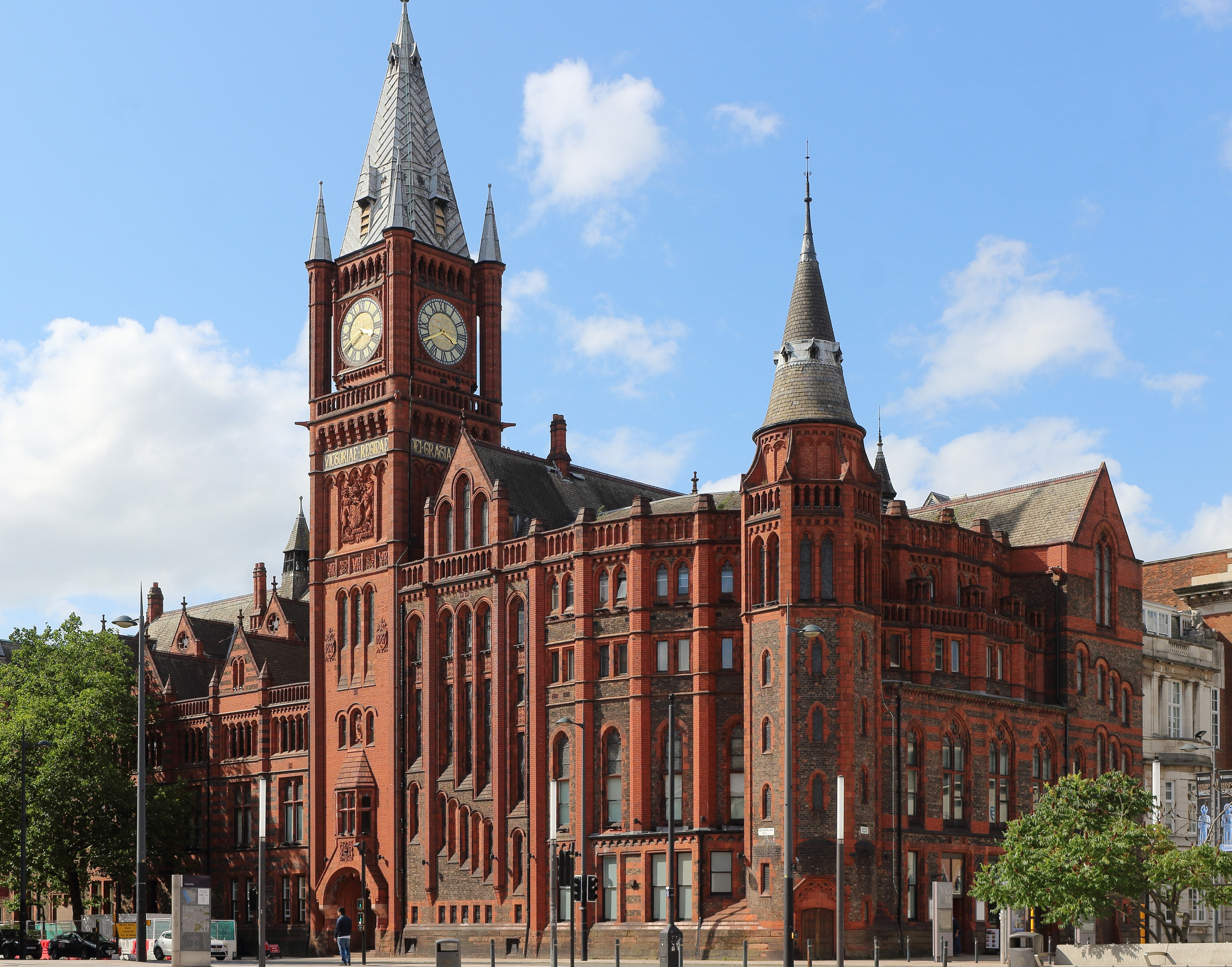
- Victoria Building, University of Liverpool

- Location within Merseyside

General information
- Architectural style: Gothic Revival
- Location: Liverpool, England
- Coordinates: 53.4062°N 2.9667°W
- Construction started: 1889
- Completed: 1892
- Cost: £53,000
- Client: University of Liverpool

Height
- Architectural: 52.7 m (173 ft)

Design and construction
- Architect: Alfred Waterhouse

Listed Building – Grade II
- Official name: Victoria Building, Liverpool University
- Designated: 14 March 1975
- Reference no.: 1205699

The Victoria Building of the University of Liverpool, is on the corner of Brownlow Hill and Ashton Street, Liverpool, Merseyside, England (grid reference SJ358903). It is recorded in the National Heritage List for England as a designated Grade II listed building. It was designed by Alfred Waterhouse and completed in 1892. It was the first purpose-built building for what was to become the University of Liverpool, with accommodation for administration, teaching, common rooms and a library. The building was the inspiration for the term "red brick university" which was coined by Professor Edgar Allison Peers. In 2008 it was converted into the Victoria Gallery & Museum.

== History ==
In 1882, University College, Liverpool, opened in a disused lunatic asylum and by 1887 it was decided that a purpose-built headquarters should be erected. Alfred Waterhouse was appointed as architect and money was raised towards the construction. Much of this was raised by a public appeal and the private donors included Henry Tate, who gave £20,000 towards the building and a further £5,500 for books in the library, and William Hartley, who paid £4,300 for the clock and bells in the tower. The builders were Brown and Backhouse and the brickwork was contracted to Joshua Henshaw and Sons. Victoria Building was officially opened in December 1892 by Lord Spencer, the Chancellor of the Victoria University.

The building housed lecture rooms, staff offices, common rooms and, on the top floor, the Tate Library. As the university grew, departments gradually moved out of the building, which became increasingly used for administration. In 1938 the Harold Cohen Library opened and the contents of the library were moved out of the Victoria Building. The former library became the Tate Hall which was used for exhibitions, formal events and as an examination room. In 1970 the administration moved from the Victoria Building into the Senate House. In 2008, to coincide with Liverpool being European Capital of Culture, the building was converted into the Victoria Gallery and Museum.

== Architecture ==
Victoria Building is constructed in Ruabon brick and common brick with terracotta dressings under a slate roof. It is an L-shaped building in three stories with 13 bays facing Brownlow Hill and five bays in Ashton Street. The southerly eight bays have alternate gables and gabled dormers. The ninth bay forms the tower. It has an arched entrance over which is an oriel window and, above this a three-light window. Over this are the royal coat of arms, a mosaic panel with an inscription and machicolation. The top stage has a four-face clock. At each angle of the tower are buttresses which rise to form pinnacles with lead spirelets. Over all is a lead spire with two tiers of lucarnes. The tenth bay has staircase windows with a gable above. The end bays curve round behind an octagonal tower with a spire.

The building is fire-proof, and constructed around an iron frame, with concrete floors. Internally the entrance hall is faced in Burmantofts terracotta, which is mainly brown but with some blue. An arcaded staircase leads to the first floor which has a lecture theatre occupying the apse at the north end. The top floor consists of a large space which contained the previous library. In the entrance hall is a life-size marble statue by Albert Bruce-Joy, the University war memorial and on the stairs are memorial plaques. The clock in the tower was made by William Potts & Sons of Leeds. Also in the tower is a chime of five bells cast by Taylors of Loughborough. Each bell is inscribed with a line from Tennyson's In Memoriam.

== Victoria Gallery and Museum ==
The Victoria Gallery & Museum is open to the public from Tuesday to Saturday each week and admission is free. On the ground floor is the Waterhouse Café and a shop. On the first floor is the art collection which comprises paintings, sculptures and ceramics. Artists represented include Joseph Wright of Derby, J. M. W. Turner, Jacob Epstein, Lucian Freud, Elisabeth Frink and John James Audubon. A series of special exhibitions is organised. Also on this floor is the Leggate Lecture Theatre in which educational talks are given.

The top floor comprises the Tate Hall Museum which contains exhibits on a variety of subjects, including zoology, medicine, dentistry, archaeology, engineering and oceanography.

== See also ==
- Grade II listed buildings in Liverpool-L3
