= List of Old Greshamians =

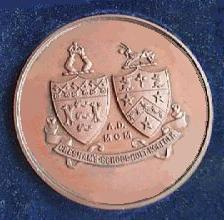

The following is a list of notable Old Greshamians, former pupils of Gresham's School, an independent coeducational boarding school in Holt, Norfolk, England.

== Public life ==
- James Allan – British High Commissioner in Mauritius and ambassador to Mozambique
- Charles M. Anderson (1918–1961), UNICEF
- Duncan Baker (born 1979) – Conservative Member of Parliament.
- Jeremy Bamber (born 1961) - British convicted mass murderer, apprehended 29 September 1985.
- Sir Eric Berthoud – British ambassador to Denmark and Poland
- Robert Brightiffe (c. 1666–1749) barrister and Member of Parliament
- Derek Bryan – Diplomat, sinologist, writer
- Erskine Childers – fourth President of Ireland
- Sir Stewart Crawford – diplomat
- Kenelm Hubert Digby (1912–2001), proposer of the notorious 1933 "King and Country" debate and later Attorney General and judge in Sarawak
- Bernard Floud – Labour politician
- Sir Cecil Graves – Director-General of the BBC
- Thomas George Greenwell – National Conservative member of parliament
- Sir Christopher Heydon – 16th century member of parliament
- Paul Howell – Conservative Member of the European Parliament for Norfolk
- Robert Lymbery - Common Serjeant of London
- Donald Maclean – diplomat and spy
- 11th Earl of Northesk – parliamentarian
- Terence O'Brien – British ambassador to Nepal, Burma and Indonesia
- John Playfair Price – diplomat, a President of the Oxford Union
- Laurance Reed – Conservative politician
- Lord Reith – first Director-General of the BBC – politician
- Wilfrid Roberts – Liberal politician
- Christian Schiller – HM Inspector of Schools
- 11th Lord Strabolgi – Labour politician
- Dr Thomas Stuttaford – Conservative politician and journalist
- C. G. H. Simon (1914–2002), Income Tax General Commissioner
- Lord Simon of Glaisdale – Conservative politician and law lord
- Lord Simon of Wythenshawe – socialist and journalist
- Sir Edward Blanshard Stamp – Lord Justice of Appeal
- Sir William Royden Stuttaford – President of the National Union of Conservative and Unionist Associations
- Sir Gerald Thesiger – High Court Judge
- Sir John Tusa – Director of BBC World Service
- Lord Wilson of High Wray – governor of the BBC and Lord Lieutenant of Westmorland and of Cumbria
- Sir Percy Wyn-Harris – governor of The Gambia

== Armed forces ==
- General Sir Terence Airey – soldier, GOC Hong Kong
- Captain Joe Baker-Cresswell – Royal Navy officer, aide-de-camp to George VI
- Peter Beck – soldier and schoolmaster
- General Sir Robert Bray – Deputy Supreme Allied Commander Europe
- Sir Stephen Bull, 2nd Baronet – killed on active service in Java, 1942
- Donald Cunnell – First World War fighter pilot
- Air Vice-Marshal Sir William Cushion – Royal Air Force officer and British Overseas Airways Corporation executive
- Major-General Guy Gregson – soldier
- Sir Christopher Heydon – took part in the capture of Cádiz, 1596
- General Sir William Holmes – Second World War general
- Henry Howard – Second World War commander of the Oxfordshire and Buckinghamshire Light Infantry
- Brigadier Julian Jefferson, British Army officer
- Major-General John Lethbridge – soldier
- Rear Admiral Martin Lucey (1920–1992), Flag Officer, Scotland and Northern Ireland and Admiral President of the Royal Naval College, Greenwich
- Major-General Patrick Marriott – Commandant of the Royal Military Academy Sandhurst 2009–2012
- Rear-Admiral Brian Perowne – Chief of Fleet Support, Royal Navy
- Brigadier Sir Philip Toosey – Bridge on the River Kwai commander
- Tom Wintringham – soldier, military historian, journalist, poet, communist
- Major-General A. E. Younger – soldier
- Major General Alastair Duncan – soldier

== Church ==
- John Astley – 18th-century Norfolk pluralist
- Edwin Boston – founder of the Cadeby Light Railway, "the Fat Clergyman" in the books of the Rev. W. Awdry
- John Bradburne – Franciscan
- John Burrell (1762–1825), clergyman and entomologist
- John Daly – bishop of The Gambia, Accra, Korea and Taejon
- Colin Forrester-Paton – missionary and Chaplain to H.M. The Queen in Scotland
- Most Rev. David Hand – Archbishop of Papua New Guinea
- Dr John Johnson (1769–1833) – clergyman and editor
- Peter Lee – bishop of the diocese of Christ the King, Johannesburg
- William Lubbock – 18th-century divine, Fellow of Caius College, Cambridge
- Charles Abdy Marcon – Master of Marcon's Hall, Oxford, 1891 to 1918
- John Moorman – Bishop of Ripon
- Thomas Pyle – 18th-century clergyman and writer
- Herbert Reeve – Church of England missionary and clergyman in New Zealand
- Robin Woods – Dean of Windsor and Bishop of Worcester

== Medicine ==
- Richard Battle – plastic surgeon
- Arthur Doyne Courtenay Bell – consultant paediatrician
- Roger Carpenter – neurophysiologist
- Major-General Joseph Crowdy – Commandant of the Royal Army Medical Corps
- Michael Fordham – psychiatrist
- Douglas Gairdner, paediatrician
- Thomas Girdlestone – physician and writer
- John Grange – immunologist
- William Henry Kelson, physician, president of the Hunterian Society
- Dermod MacCarthy – paediatrician
- William Rushton FRS – physiologist
- Thomas Stuttaford – doctor and politician
- Hugh Christian Watkins – cardiologist
- Anthony Yates – rheumatologist

=== Nobel Prize-winner ===
- Sir Alan Lloyd Hodgkin – Nobel Prize for Medicine, President of the Royal Society, Master of Trinity College, Cambridge

== Academics ==
=== Arts ===
- John Bensusan-Butt – landscape painter
- Norman Cohn – historian
- Oliver Elton – literary critic, translator
- Boris Ford – literary critic, editor
- Alfred Gissing – biographer
- John Davy Hayward – editor and critic
- Andrew Hurrell - Professor of International Relations, Oxford University
- Michael Kitson – art historian
- James Klugmann – Communist historian
- 2nd Baron Lindsay of Birker – political scientist
- W. Wesley Pue – academic lawyer
- Sir James Maude Richards – architectural historian
- E. Clive Rouse – archaeologist
- John Saltmarsh – historian
- Brian Simon – educational historian
- Peter J N Sinclair – economist

=== Sciences ===
- L. E. Baynes – aeronautical engineer
- Arnold Beck – electrical engineer, Professor of Engineering at Cambridge
- David Bensusan-Butt – economist
- Derek Bryan – sinologist
- Anthony Bull – transport engineer
- Sir Henry Clay, 6th Baronet – engineer
- Sir Christopher Cockerell – inventor of the hovercraft
- Nicholas Day - statistician and epidemiologist
- James Durrant - FRS Professor of Photochemistry, Imperial College
- C. H. Gimingham – botanist
- Dr Hildebrand Hervey FRS – marine biologist
- Sir John Hammond – agricultural research scientist
- Ian Hepburn, botanist and schoolteacher
- Harry Hodson – economist
- G. Evelyn Hutchinson – zoologist
- Bryan Keith-Lucas – political scientist
- David Keith-Lucas – aeronautical engineer
- David Lack – evolutionary biologist
- David Layton – economist and industrial relations specialist
- Dr Colin Leakey – botanist
- Maurice Lister – chemist
- Jonathan Partington – mathematician
- Frank Perkins – engineer
- Henry Snaith - FRS Professor of Physics, Oxford University
- Christopher Strachey – computer scientist
- Sir Owen Wansbrough-Jones – chemist, weapons research scientist
- Sir Martin Wood – engineer

== Writers ==
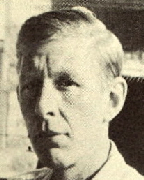
W. H. Auden

=== Poets ===
- W. H. Auden – poet
- John Henry Colls, 18th century poet
- Andrew Jefford – poet and wine writer
- Michael Laskey – poet
- John Pudney – poet and novelist
- Sir Stephen Spender – poet

=== Novelists ===
- John Lanchester – novelist
- Sabin Willett – novelist

=== Journalists ===
- Matt Arnold – journalist and television presenter
- Bruce Belfrage - BBC Radio newsreader and actor
- Cedric Belfrage – journalist and author
- Mark Brayne – BBC foreign correspondent and psychotherapist
- Rupert Hamer – journalist killed in Afghanistan
- Alastair Hetherington – journalist, editor of The Guardian
- Paddy O'Connell – journalist and main presenter of BBC Radio 4's Broadcasting House
- Edmund Rogers – journalist
- Philip Pembroke Stephens – journalist
- Sir John Tusa – BBC journalist

=== Other ===
- Maurice Ash – environmentalist writer
- Sir Christopher Heydon – 17th century writer on astrology
- Lady Flora McDonnell – children's author
- Pat Simon – wine writer and Master of Wine
- Kenneth Taylor – television scriptwriter
- William Osborne — screenwriter

== Music ==
- Richard Austin – conductor
- Benjamin Britten, Lord Britten of Aldeburgh – composer
- Sir Lennox Berkeley – composer
- John Carewe – conductor and teacher
- Richard Hand – classical guitarist
- Christopher J. Monckton – organist and conductor
- Heathcote Dicken Statham – composer and organist
- George Stiles – composer
- Roderick Watkins – composer
- Hammond Witherley – singer

== Artists ==
- Michael Cummings – cartoonist
- Richard Chopping – book cover illustrator, painter and novelist
- William Lionel Clause, landscape artist
- Sir Philip Dowson – architect and president of the Royal Academy
- Edward Frank Gillett – sporting artist
- Robert Medley RA – artist
- Ben Nicholson, OM – artist
- Christopher Nicholson – architect
- Christopher Perkins – artist
- Humphrey Spender – photographer
- Tony Tuckson – artist
- Charles Mayes Wigg – artist

== Sport ==
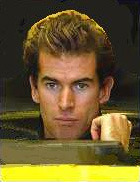
Ralph Firman

- Giles Baring – cricketer
- Glyn Barnett – rifleman, Commonwealth Games gold medallist 2006
- Tom Bourdillon – mountaineer
- Gawain Briars – British No. 1 squash player
- 11th Earl of Northesk – Olympic medallist (skeleton, 1928)
- Andrew Corran – cricketer
- Peter Croft – cricketer and Olympic field hockey player
- Matthew Dickinson – mountaineer and adventurer
- Dennis Eagan – field hockey player, bronze medallist in the 1952 Summer Olympics
- Natasha Firman – Formula Woman racing driver
- Ralph Firman – Formula One racing driver
- Kimberley Halton-Farrow – triathlete
- Julian Jefferson – cricketer
- Richard Leman – hockey player and Olympic gold medallist
- Peter Lloyd – mountaineer
- Richard Millman - Squash national champion and coach
- Andy Mulligan – captain of Ireland and the British and Irish Lions Rugby XV
- Tom Percival (1943–1984) – powerboat racer
- Ben Pienaar – rugby union player and Junior National Champion at judo
- Harry Simmons – rugby footballer
- Pat Symonds – Formula One racing
- Nick Youngs – England rugby union footballer
- Ben Youngs – England Rugby Team, British Lion and member of Leicester Tigers and Heineken Cup medal winner
- Tom Youngs – England Rugby Team, British Lion
- Sir Percy Wyn-Harris – mountaineer

== Performing arts ==
- Kat Alano – model, actress
- Michael Aldridge – actor
- Bruce Belfrage – actor, news reader, politician
- Peter Brook – theatre director
- Olivia Colman (Sarah Colman) – actress
- Michael Culver – actor
- Ian D. Clark – Canadian actor
- Henry Daniell – actor
- Nigel Dick – music video and film director
- Stephen Frears – film director
- Sienna Guillory – actress
- Geoffrey Gwyther – singer, actor, and songwriter
- Julian Jarrold – television and film director
- Ben Mansfield – actor
- Robert Mawdesley – actor
- Bill Mason – documentary film maker
- Paddy O'Connell – television presenter
- Miranda Raison – actress
- Sebastian Shaw – actor
- Patrick Waddington – actor
- Peter Whitbread – actor and scriptwriter

== Business ==
- Sir Harold Atcherley – Royal Dutch Shell executive; Chairman of Tyzack & Partners
- Randal McDonnell, 10th Earl of Antrim – Chairman of Sarasin and Partners LLP
- Sir James Dyson – inventor and entrepreneur
- Sir Nigel Foulkes –Chairman of the British Airports Authority and the Civil Aviation Authority
- Anthony Habgood – Chairman of Court, Bank of England. Chairman of Reed Elsevier and past chairman Whitbread
- Sir Robin Ibbs – banker
- Charles Kearley – property developer and art collector
- Sir Christopher Howes – chief executive of the Crown Estate
- Sir William Stuttaford – stockbroker and business man
- John L. Marden – Chairman of Wheelock and Marden Co. Ltd

== Other ==
- Robert Aagaard – furniture maker and founder of the youth movement Cathedral Camps
- Theodore Acland – headmaster of Norwich School
- Sir John Agnew, 6th Baronet – landowner, festivals organizer
- Sir George Anthony Agnew, 7th Baronet – landowner
- Jeremy Bamber – convicted murderer
- Bill Bell – chief legal adviser to Lloyds Bank
- Thomas Blanco White QC, British patent lawyer
- John Bradbury, 3rd Baron Bradbury
- Martin Burgess FSA – master clockmaker
- Rupert Byron, 11th Baron Byron
- Trevor Roberts, 2nd Baron Clwyd
- Anthony Coke, 6th Earl of Leicester
- Sir Weldon Dalrymple-Champneys CB DM FRCP
- David W. Doyle – CIA officer and author
- James Halman (died 1702), Master of Gonville and Caius College, Cambridge
- Christopher Newbury – Council of Europe
- John Carnegie, 12th Earl of Northesk
- Ian Proctor – yacht designer
- 8th Baron Suffield
- Robin Shaw – media lawyer

== In fiction ==
Among fictional OGs, John Mortimer's television barrister Rumpole sent his son Nick to the school during the 1970s.

== Notable Gresham's masters ==
- Logie Bruce Lockhart – Scotland rugby footballer, headmaster
- Warin Foster Bushell – later headmaster of Michaelhouse and Birkenhead School and president of the Mathematical Association
- Antony R. Clark – headmaster since 2002, first-class cricketer
- C. V. Durell – writer of mathematics textbooks
- Graeme Fife – writer – playwright and broadcaster
- Walter Greatorex – composer
- Dalziel Llewellyn Hammick – research chemist
- John Holmes – writer of textbooks on grammar, rhetoric and astronomy
- George Howson – headmaster, 1900-1919
- Charles W. Lloyd – Master of Dulwich College
- Frank McEachran – author
- Geoffrey Shaw – organist and composer
- Patrick Thompson – Conservative Member of Parliament
- Hugh Wright – Headmaster 1985–1991, later Chairman of the Headmasters' Conference
- Professor Richard D'Aeth (later Master of Hughes Hall, Cambridge)

== Notable governors of the school ==
- Graham George Able, 2013–2020
- Theodore Dyke Acland
- A. C. Benson
- Field Marshal Sir Evelyn Wood
- Sir Richard Carew Pole, 13th Baronet
- Pauline Perry, Baroness Perry of Southwark
- Sir Angus Stirling
- David Cairns, 5th Earl Cairns
- Anthony Duckworth-Chad
- Anne, Princess Royal
- James Dyson

== See also ==
- Gresham's School
- List of Masters of Gresham's School
