= List of masters of Gresham's School =

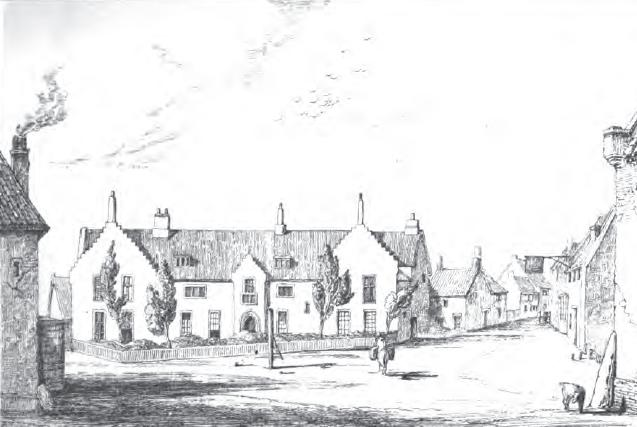
The original school, founded in Sir John Gresham's manor house at Holt, sketched in 1838

This is a list of the Masters (later Headmasters) and Ushers (later Second Masters) of Gresham's School, Holt.

== Masters, 1562–1900 ==
- 1571: Master Robinson
- 1574–1582: Master Harrison
- 1585–1602: Christopher Williams
- 1602–1605: Rev. Richard Snoden MA
- 1605–1606: Rev. Francis Catlyn MA
- 1606–1639: Thomas Tallis MA
- 1639–1640: Rev. Nathaniel Gill
- 1640: Thomas Tallis (again)
- 1640–1644: Sir Thomas Witherley
- 1644–1646: John Fenn
- 1646–1659: Rev. Francis Wright MA, fellow of Merton College, Oxford
- 1659–1660: Rev. William Hickes MA, previously Master of Oundle
- 1661–1665: Rev. Henry Mazey MA, Fellow of Caius College, Cambridge
- 1665–1667: Rev. John Goodman (acting Master)
- 1667–1692: Rev. Thomas Bainbridge MA
- 1692–1697: Rev. William Reynolds MA
- 1697–1702: Edward Reynolds
- 1702–1715: Rev. William Reynolds MA
- 1715–1729: Rev. David Duncombe MA (d. 1729)
- 1730–1760: John Holmes - writer of textbooks on grammar, rhetoric and astronomy
- 1760: John Knox
- 1760–1787: James Smith
- 1787–1806: Thomas Atkins
- 1806–1807: Rev. Mr Babington (acting Master)
- 1807–1809: Thomas Atkins (again)
- 1809–1857: Rev. Benjamin Pulleyne, or Pullan MA, fellow of Clare College, Cambridge
- 1858–1867: Rev. Charles Allen Elton MA BD, fellow of Sidney Sussex College, Cambridge
- 1867–1900: Rev. Reginald Jolliffe Roberts MA

== Headmasters, 1900 to date ==
- 1900–1919: George William Saul Howson MA, formerly of Uppingham, reforming headmaster
- 1919–1935: J. R. Eccles MA
- 1935–1944: Philip Staniforth Newell MA
- 1944–1955: Martin John Olivier MA - previously of Rossall, later head of Guthlaxton College, Wigston Magna
- 1955–1982: Logie Bruce Lockhart, international rugby footballer
- 1982–1985: Dr Timothy Phillips Woods MA DPhil
- 1985–1991: Hugh Wright MA, later Chief Master of King Edward's School, Birmingham (1991–1998) and Chairman of the HMC
- 1991–2002: John Hardy Arkell MA, formerly head of Wrekin College
- 2002–2008: Anthony Roy Clark MA, - formerly head of St. Andrew's College, Grahamstown, South Africa
- 2008–2013 : Philip John - formerly head of King William's College, Isle of Man
- 2013–2014 : Nigel Flower (acting headmaster)
- 2014– : Douglas Robb MA MEd

== Ushers ==
- 1602–1606: Nicholas Stephenson
- ? to 1621: John Watson
- 1627–1632: Thomas Cooper
- 1632–1638: Nicholas Davie
- 1638: Thomas Cooper (again)
- 1638–1639: Henry Luce
- 1640: Henry Luce (again)
- 1640–1643: Timothy Cutler
- 1643–1644: Thomas Cooper (again) - hanged in 1650 as a Royalist rebel
- 1658–1660: Henry Mazy
- 1661–1665: John Goodman
- 1689–1692: Thomas Kellway
- 1692: William Chambers
- 1692–1695: Thomas Garrett
- 1695: William Rowland
- 1696–1697: Thomas Turner
- 1697–1704: Thomas Plumstead
- 1705–1708: John Reynolds
- 1708: John Fox
- 1708–1713: William Selth
- 1713–1714: John Spurling
- 1714–1715: William Chaplyn
- c. 1718: John Brooke
- c. 1725: John Holmes
- 1729: Edward Read
- 1770s: Christopher Stangroom
- 1796–1801: David Kinnebrook
- 1810–1811: Reverend Robert Davies
- 1811–1813: Peter Barney
- 1813–1821: Daniel Carr
- 1821: James Sturley
- 1821–1828: Thomas Beckwith
- 1828–1843: William Robert Taylor
- 1843–1851: John Slann (first Second Master)

Thomas Beckwith used the title "undermaster" in 1821.

== Second masters ==
- 1843–1851: John Slann (last Usher)
- 1851: William Allen Rudkin
- 1851–1857: John Hubbert Kent
- 1858–1860: J. Rodney Phillips
- 1860: Berney Wodehouse Raven
- 1860–1862: Charles Frederick Furbank
- 1862–1863: Frederick Roy Dowson
- 1863–1864: George W. Anstiss
- 1864–1865: Henry David Jones
- 1865–1866: William Henry Hooper
- 1866–1867: Matthew Walter Tunnicliffe
- 1867: William Remington Backhouse
- 1867: John Robinson Wells
- 1867–1869: Robert Stokes
- 1869–1871: Robert Campbell Conolly
- 1871–1872: John Lowndes
- 1872–1880: Stephen Bousfield
- 1881–1900: John Henry Howell
- 1900–1907: John Goodrich Wemyss Woods
- 1907–1919: James Ronald Eccles, later headmaster
- 1919–1928: John Chambré Miller
- 1928–1942: Joseph Foster
- 1942–1963: A. Bruce Douglas
- 1963–1970: Bernard Sankey
- 1970–1977: Paul V. A. Colombé
- 1977–1985: John Coleridge
- 1985–2001: Richard N. K. Copas

== Deputy heads (Pastoral) ==
- 2001–2006: S. Smart
- 2006–2016: N. C. Flower
- 2016–2020: W.A.M. Chuter
- 2020-present: E. Alexander

== Deputy Heads (Academic) ==
- 2001–2010: N. White
- 2010–2013: D. Miles
- 2013–2016 : S. Kinder
- 2016–2023: T.P. Hipperson
- 2024-present: D. Chart-Boyles

== Chaplains ==
- 1900–1901: R. L. Langford
- 1901–1908: E. E. M. Benson
- 1908–1930: Francis George Elwes Field, MA (Cantab.), previously headmaster of Truro Grammar School
- 1930–1932: J. W. Reynolds
- 1932–1946: Edward Francis Habershon
- 1946–1950: Charles L. S. Linnell
- 1950–1959: Wilfred Andrews
- 1959–1974: Douglas C. Argyle, died 2012
- 1974–1975: Percival Hallewell Rogers (previously headmaster of Portora Royal School, Enniskillen, 1954–1973)
- 1975–1983 T. Ray Bowen
- 1983–1991: Alan Wadge, later Rector of Sparsholt
- 1991–1992: Richard Buckner (died in office)
- 1992 (acting): Patrick Rix
- 1992–2000: Robin N. Myerscough
- 2001–2020: Bryan R. Roberts
- 2020– : Jack Branford

== Headmasters of the Junior School ==
- 1954–1969: John B. Williams
- 1969–1979: Michael Hughes
- 1979–1984: Neville Jones

The Junior School was reorganized into the Preparatory School and the Pre-Preparatory School in 1984.

== Headmasters of the Preparatory School ==
- 1984–2003: Tony Cuff
- 2003–2018: James Quick
- 2018-date: Catherine Braithwaite

== Heads of the Pre-Preparatory School ==
- 1984–1991: Penelope Moore
- 1991–1997: Lesley Gillick
- 1997–2002: Daphne Dawson-Smith
- 2002–2017: Janette Davidson
- 2017–present: Sarah Hollingsworth

== Housemasters and staff ==
Boys' houses

House	Housemaster	Assistant housemaster
Howson's	J. Cowan	E. Robinson
Farfield	T. Burnett	J. Beales
Tallis	C. Cox	C. Oates
Woodlands	J. Sharrock	S. Knightbridge

Girls' houses

House	Housemistress	Assistant Housemistress
Edinburgh	E. Fern	E. Wilson
Queens' (formerly Britten)	V. Seldon	E. Philpott
Oakeley	O. Ravilious	D. Majid

== Notable masters ==
- John Holmes (master, 1730–1760), writer of textbooks on grammar, rhetoric and astronomy
- George Howson (headmaster, 1900–1919)
- Geoffrey Shaw (music master, 1902–1910), organist and composer
- C. V. Durell (assistant master, 1904–05), writer of mathematics textbooks
- Warin Foster Bushell (assistant master, 1907–1912), later headmaster of Michaelhouse and Birkenhead School and president of the Mathematical Association
- Dalziel Llewellyn Hammick (assistant master, Chemistry, 1910–1918) - research chemist
- Walter Greatorex (director of music, 1911–1949), composer
- Arnold Powell (assistant master, early 1900s), later head of Bedford Modern School and Epsom College
- Frank McEachran (assistant master from 1924), author
- Denys Thompson (assistant master, English, 1930s), editor of the quarterly Scrutiny with F. R. Leavis and of the journal The Use of English
- Richard D'Aeth (assistant master, 1938–1940)
- Charles W. Lloyd (assistant master, 1946–1951), later master of Dulwich College
- Logie Bruce Lockhart (headmaster, 1955–1982), Scotland rugby footballer
- Richard Smyth (born 1951), later head of King's School, Bruton
- Hugh Wright (headmaster 1985-1991), later chief master of King Edward's School, Birmingham (1991–1998) and Chairman of the HMC
- Patrick Thompson (assistant master, physics, 1965–1983), Conservative Member of Parliament
- Graeme Fife (classics master, 1970–1979), writer, playwright and broadcaster

== Governors ==
- Theodore Dyke Acland
- Graham George Able (2013–2020)

== See also ==
- Gresham's School
- List of Old Greshamians
- Category:People educated at Gresham's School
