= Francis Wright =

Francis Wright may refer to:

- Francis Mastin Wright (1810–1869), Ohio Republican politician
- Francis Augustus Wright (1835–1903), Australian politician and merchant sailor
- Francis Marion Wright (1844–1917), United States federal judge
- Francis Wright (cricketer) (1874–1899), Australian cricketer
- Francis Wright (actor) (born 1958), English actor and puppeteer
- Francis Wright (academic) (c. 1610–1659), English Church of England clergyman, Oxford don, and schoolmaster
- Francis Wright (industrialist) (1806–1873), English industrialist
- Francis Wright (rugby union) (1909–1959), Scotland international rugby union player
- Felix (music producer) or Francis Wright, British DJ and producer

== See also ==
- Frances Wright (disambiguation)
- Frank Wright (disambiguation)
