= Robert Heath (disambiguation) =

Sir Robert Heath (1575–1649) was an English judge and member of parliament (MP).

Robert Heath may also refer to:

- Robert W. Heath Jr. (born 1973), American electrical engineer and professor
- Robert Heath (MP for Stoke-upon-Trent) (1816–1893), British Conservative Party politician
- Robert Heath (mathematician) (died 1779), British army officer and periodical editor
- Robert Galbraith Heath (1915–1999), psychiatrist
- Robert Heath (footballer) (born 1978), English footballer who played for Stoke City

== See also ==
- Robert Heath & Sons Ltd., former coal and iron masters in Staffordshire, England, see Foxfield Railway
- Robert Hethe (died 1396), MP for Ipswich
