= EGQ =

EGQ may refer to:

- English Guitar Quartet, organization led by Richard Hand
- EGQ, station code for Xiping West railway station
- EGQ, FAA code for Emmetsburg Municipal Airport, an airport in Iowa
- EGQ, code to identify variant of the Chrysler SOHC V6 engine
