= Hethe (surname) =

Hethe is a surname. Notable people with the surname include:

- Thomas Hethe, MP for Suffolk (UK Parliament constituency)
- Robert Hethe (died 1396), English politician
- Hamo Hethe
