= Thomas Witherley =

Sir Thomas Witherley MD (1618–1694) was Physician in Ordinary to King Charles II, Second Physician to King James II, and President of the Royal College of Physicians from 1684 to 1687.

In 1688, Witherley was present at the birth of James Francis Edward Stuart.

In his earlier life, before his medical training, he had been a schoolmaster.

== Career ==
Witherley was born at Burlingham St Peter, Norfolk, on 21 August 1618. His mother was the sister of Sir Edmund Reve, Justice of the Court of Common Pleas.

In 1640, on his uncle's recommendation, Witherley was appointed Master of Sir John Gresham's Grammar School at Holt in his native county. In October 1642, it was reported to the Fishmongers' Company, the school's trustees, that there had been a long outbreak of smallpox in Holt and that the school had had "noe schollers since Midsomer last yett the schoolmaster hath attended..." However, in May 1643 the Fishmongers heard that Witherley had been "betaking himselfe to the studie and profession of phisick" when he asked for a six-month leave of absence to enable him to take a medical degree in the Netherlands. This request appears to have been refused, as Witherley did not depart until after he had resigned his position as Master of the school in September 1644.

Witherley took the degree of doctor of medicine at the University of Cambridge in 1655 and in December 1664 was elected an honorary fellow of the College of Physicians. By 1677 he had been appointed physician in ordinary to King Charles II, and on 7 April of that year he became a fellow of the college. On 21 January 1678/79 he became an elect, was censor of the college (by now renamed the Royal College of Physicians) in 1683 and president from 1684 to 1687.

In 1688, at the time of the birth of James Francis Edward Stuart, son and heir of King James II, when the new prince was widely believed to have been smuggled into the Queen's bedchamber in a bed-pan, Witherley was Second Physician to the King and gave evidence that he had been present at the birth. He deposed that he "saw Mrs Labadie bring the child from the midwife, and carry him into the next room... and saw the child before he was cleaned..." A strong royalist, he was later accused by the Whig historian Burnett of being complicit in a plot by King James to turn a changeling into Prince of Wales so that there could be a Roman Catholic heir to the throne.

Witherley died on 23 March 1693/94. He was the father of Hammond Witherley, a singer.
