= Jane Lunnon =

English schoolteacher and headmistress

Jane Teresa Lunnon (born 1969) is an English schoolteacher and headmistress, currently head of Alleyn's School, Dulwich, and previously of Wimbledon High School. Before that, Lunnon was Deputy Head of Wellington College, Berkshire.

== Early life ==
Lunnon was educated at the North London Collegiate School and the University of Bristol, where she graduated in English. She has a twin sister, Jenny, who is head of City of London School for Girls.

== Career ==
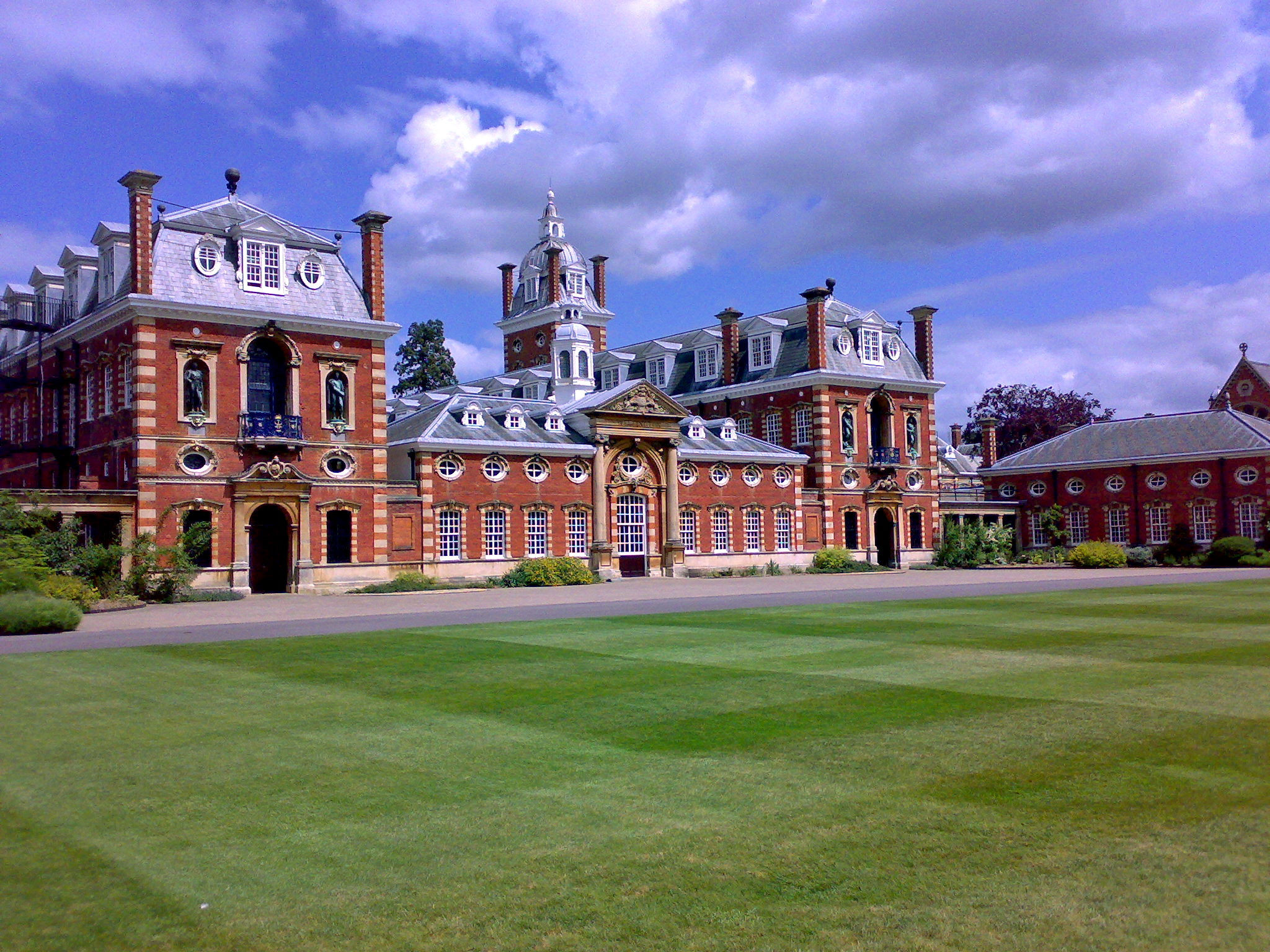
Wellington College

Lunnon’s early career was in research and marketing, before she became a schoolteacher at Prior's Field School, Guildford, and then at Wellington College. There, she was successively Head of English, Head of Sixth Form, and Assistant Director of Studies, then from 2010 Senior Deputy Head to Anthony Seldon. In 2014 she was appointed as Headmistress of Wimbledon High School, and in 2020 as the first female Head of Alleyn’s School, taking up the post in January 2021. Although the school had become co-educational in 1975, all its heads had been men since its separation from the College of God's Gift in 1882.

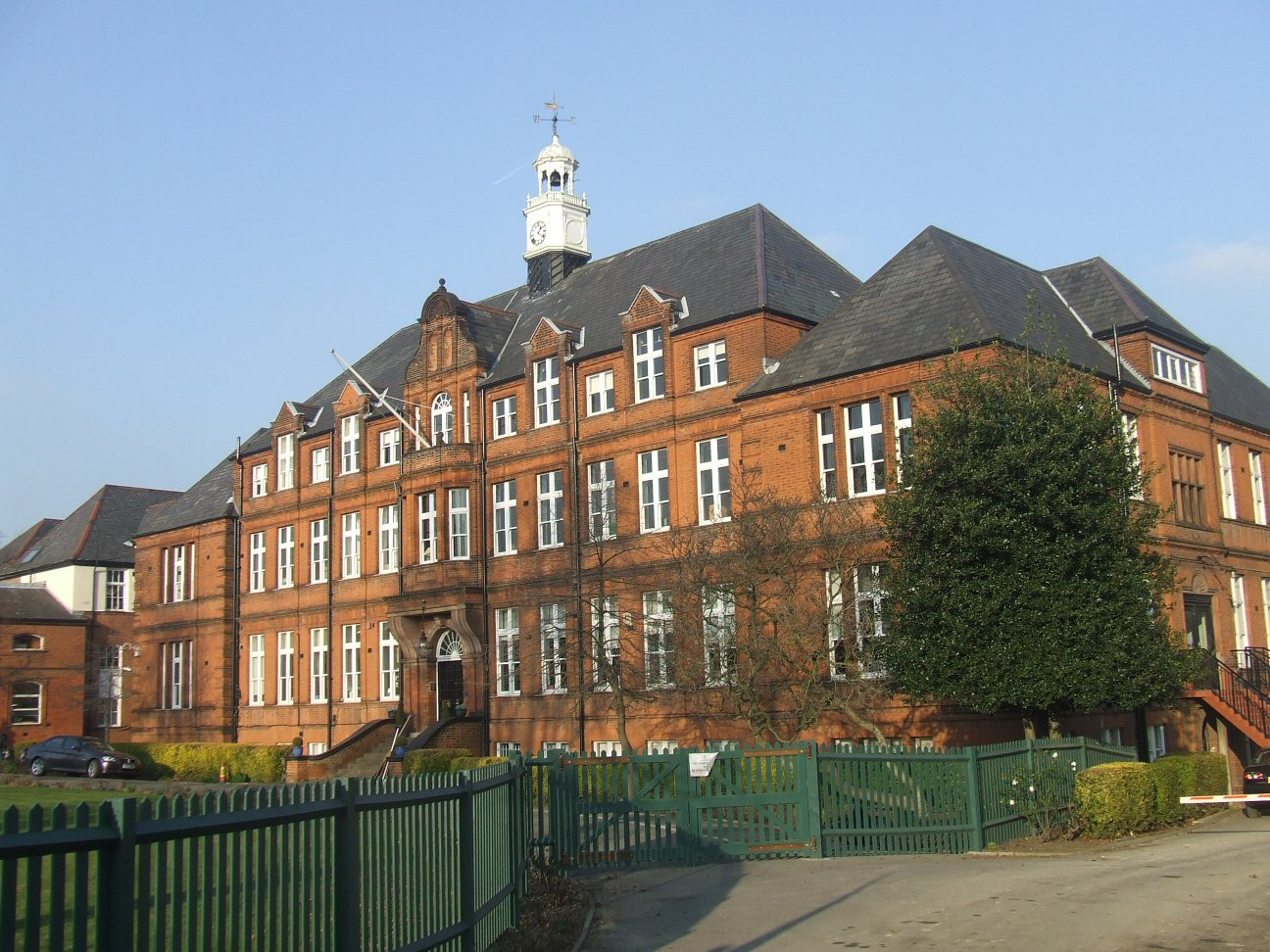
Alleyn's School, Dulwich

In 2018, Krishnan Guru-Murthy quoted Lunnon on the subject of Love Island that it was "not really doing anything very much for feminism". In January 2020, The Times reported her warning to parents against using WhatsApp groups to manage their children’s time when they were in secondary schools. She saw this as hindering them from learning to take responsibility for the demands of their lives. In May 2020, The Daily Telegraph interviewed Lunnon on the challenges to schools of lockdown in the COVID-19 pandemic.

In September 2020, Lunnon was announced as one of the five nominees in the "Best head of a public school" category of the Tatler Schools Awards, together with Douglas Robb of Gresham's School, Mark Turnbull of Giggleswick, Emma McKendrick of Downe House, and Antony Wallersteiner of Stowe. Lunnon was announced as winner of the award in October.

Lunnon also serves on the Education Committee of the Royal Shakespeare Company, the Universities Committee of the Headmasters' and Headmistresses' Conference, and the governing body of Newland House School. She is a Trustee of the Royal SpringBoard Foundation.

== Personal life ==
Lunnon married a fellow teacher at Wellington College. Her husband, Neil Lunnon, is now headmaster of Fulham Prep School, and they have two children.
