= Maurice Lister =

British academic (1914–2003)

Professor Maurice Wolfenden Lister (27 March 1914 in Tunbridge Wells, Kent – 27 June 2003 in Woodstock, Ontario, Canada) was a leading academic chemist and writer.

== Education ==
Educated at Gresham's School, Holt, and Oriel College, Oxford, he took the degrees of BA, MA, and DPhil at Oxford. He then crossed the Atlantic to Harvard on a Commonwealth Scholarship to work on atomic research and spectroscopy.

While at Oxford, Lister was a top middle-distance runner, and he was offered the opportunity to train for the 1936 Olympic Games, but he decided he must give priority to his academic work.

== Career ==
At the beginning of the Second World War Lister joined the National Research Council of Canada and before long was a major in the Canadian Army. Soon after the war he joined Atomic Energy Canada in Chalk River, Ontario, and then in 1949 the chemistry department at the University of Toronto, where he remained until 1982.

His main research interests were in the kinetics and mechanisms of inorganic reactions. His work on the oxyacids and oxyanions of the halogens was important.

== Family ==
Lister married Lois, a Toronto landscape architect, in 1940, and they had five children. His wife died in 1995.

== Publications ==
Oxyacids by Maurice Wolfenden Lister (Oldbourne, 1965)

== Other Appointments ==
- Trustee of the Toronto Board of Education, from 1964
- Chairman of the Toronto Board of Education, from 1970
- Professor Emeritus, University of Toronto, 1982

== Sources ==
- Obituary of Professor Maurice Lister, Toronto University
- Obituary of Professor Maurice Lister at the Toronto Star
