= Frank McEachran =

British schoolmaster and writer (1900–1975)

Frank McEachran (6 June 1900 – 4 October 1975), sometimes known as Kek, was a British schoolmaster and writer. He taught at English public schools and the University of Leipzig and wrote on philosophy, but his most commercially successful books were his anthologies Spells for Poets and More Spells which appeared in the 1950s.

He was an active proponent of Georgism.

== Early life ==
The son of an engineer from Wolverhampton, McEachran was educated at Manchester Grammar School and then at Magdalen College, Oxford, where he held a scholarship in modern languages. After graduating BA, he gained the further degree of BLitt, with work on Johann Gottfried Herder, whom he researched at the University of Leipzig. He was there in 1923, during the period of hyperinflation, of which he had vivid memories. Finally, McEachran took a Diploma of Education, for which he spent a term of teaching at Sedbergh School.

== Career ==
In September 1924, McEachran began to teach at Gresham's School, Holt, where he remained for ten years. Among the boys he influenced while there was the future poet W. H. Auden, and one writer on Auden detects traces of McEachran's "humanist world-view" in Auden's poetry until it was overtaken by the existentialism of Kierkegaard in the 1940s. McEachran also taught the future communist James Klugmann.

McEachran left Gresham's in 1934, which a biographer attributes to a difference of opinion with the headmaster, J. R. Eccles. He was then out of work for several months and spent them on a walking tour of Greece and a journey from Odessa in Ukraine to Leningrad, travelling with Intourist. These resulted in two diaries, "A Walk Round Greece" and "A Russian Diary", which were published in 1979.

In 1935, McEachran was appointed as a schoolmaster at Shrewsbury School, where he spent the rest of his career. At Shrewsbury he taught Martin Wainwright, who has recalled that "Frank McEachran stood us on chairs at school reciting poetry we'd learned by heart. Probably child abuse these days, but he called it Spells and I can still remember them all." He is remembered at Shrewsbury School through the McEachran Room, where the Creative Writing Society meets, some still influenced by his writings.

Beyond his main job, McEachran also taught Italian, English, and philosophy, at other schools, including Shrewsbury High School, where one of his pupils was Mary Beard. She remembered him as eccentric and inspirational.

McEachran was a friend of poet, essayist and playwright T. S. Eliot and contributed to Eliot's magazine The Criterion.

McEachran's anthology Spells (1953), later re-issued as Spells for Poets, is divided into eight parts: 'Sheer', 'Queer', 'Fear', 'Love', 'Death', 'Odd', 'God', and 'Postscript'.

McEachran died in October 1975 at Kingsland House, Shrewsbury.

== Books ==
- The Civilised Man (London: Faber and Faber, 1930)
- The Unity of Europe (London: Search Publishing Co., 1932)
- The Destiny of Europe (London: Faber and Faber, 1932)
- The Life and Philosophy of Johann Gottfried Herder (Oxford: Clarendon Press, 1939)
- Spells (Basil Blackwell, 1955, reissued as Spells for Poets (Garnstone Press paperback, 1974, ISBN 0855111917, ISBN 9780855111915)
- Freedom – the Only End (London: Johnson Publications, 1966)
- More Spells: a New Anthology of Words and Comment (Garnstone Press, 1970, ISBN 0900391278)
- Two Diaries: Greece, Russia, 1934 (Shrewsbury School, 1979)
- A Cauldron of Spells (posthumous collection, with introduction by Laurence Le Quesne; Greenbank Press, 1992)

== Other selected publications ==
- "The Rift", in The Nineteenth Century, March 1927
- "The idea of progress and Goethe's Faust", in The Nineteenth Century, June 1927
- "Human personality in Dante's Divine Comedy", in The Nineteenth Century, October 1927
- "Henry George and Karl Marx", presented at the International Conference, London, September, 1936
- "A Pattern for Reality", in The Criterion, April 1938
- "The Unspoken Word", in The Grasshopper, Howson Memorial Edition, 1955
- "The Existential Philosophy" in The Hibbert Journal, April 1948
- "The Problem of Pascal" in The Adelphi, April–June 1948
- "The Philosopher's Task" in The Hibbert Journal, January 1964
- "On Translating Nietzsche" (1975)
- "The Field of Force" in Land and Liberty, September 1975
- "The Impotence of Man" in Land and Liberty, November 1975
