= Hammond Witherley =

Hammond Witherley (1655 – 7 October 1717) was an English choral singer.

The son of Sir Thomas Witherley MD of the City of London, the young Witherley was educated at Holt School in Norfolk and Gonville and Caius College, Cambridge, where he graduated BA in 1774.

On 23 January 1690, at St Augustine the Less, Bristol, Witherley married Elizabeth Throckmorton.

A singer at the Chapel Royal, a report of his funeral on 9 October 1717 notes that he was carried from his house in Queen Square, Westminster, and "interred in great state" in Westminster Abbey, with Dr Atterbury, Bishop of Rochester and Dean of Westminster, leading the funeral service.

Witherley and his wife had no children. She survived him until February 1732. Dying at the age of eighty, she left land in Gloucestershire to a niece.
