= Benjamin Pulleyne =

British mathematician, clergyman, and schoolmaster

Benjamin Pulleyne, sometimes spelt Pullan (30 September 1785 – 20 October 1861), was a mathematician, Church of England clergyman, fellow of Clare College, Cambridge, and schoolmaster. For almost fifty years he was the Master of Gresham's School, then usually known as Holt Grammar School.

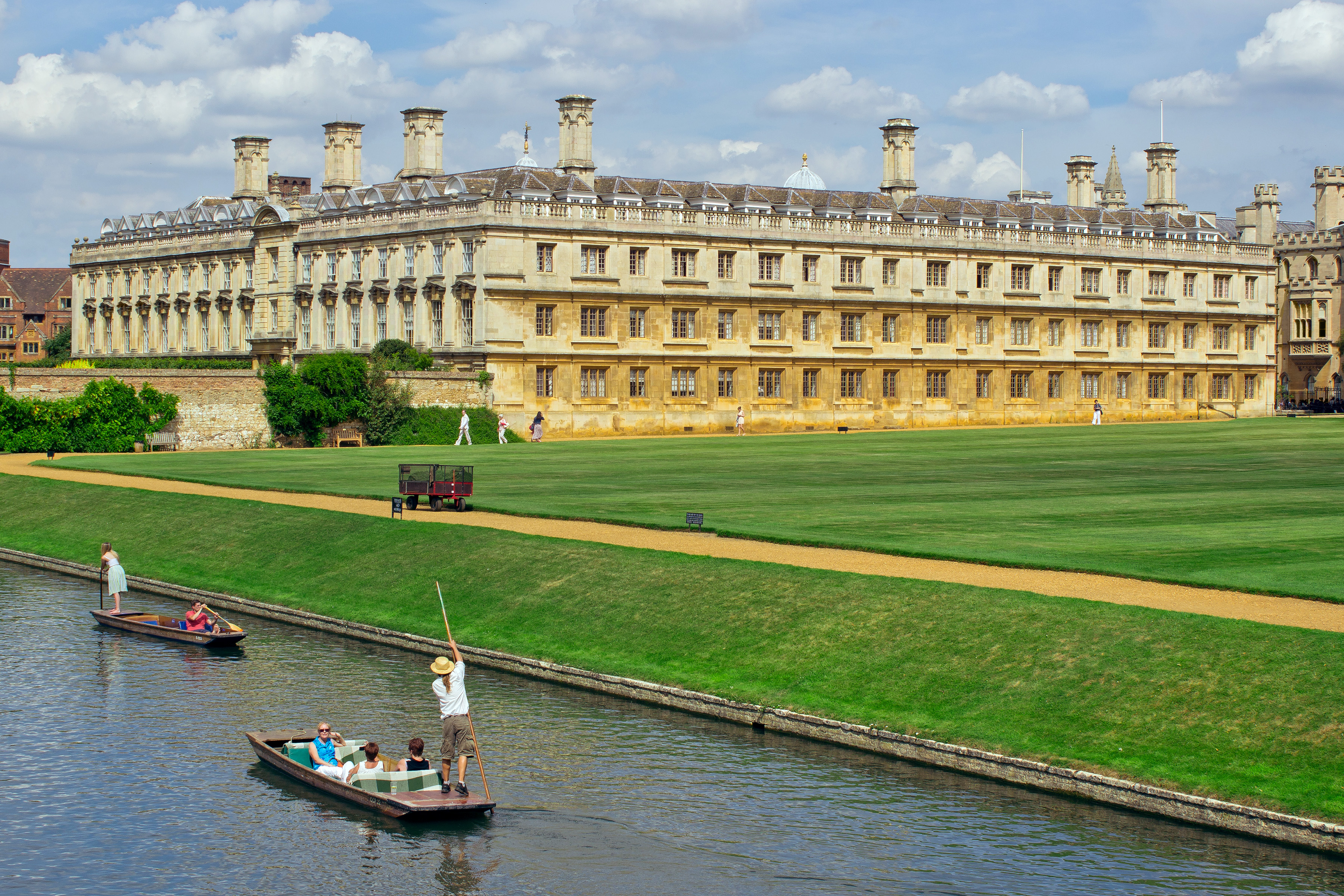
Clare College, Cambridge

Born at Scarborough, North Yorkshire, the son of Benjamin Pullan, a merchant, and his wife Elizabeth, the young Pulleyne (the spelling of the name he used for himself) was educated at Wakefield Grammar School and was admitted to Clare College, Cambridge, on 2 February 1804. He was elected a Cave Scholar on 19 January 1805 and was Senior Optime in 1808.

He graduated BA in 1808, promoted by seniority to MA in 1811, and was a Fellow of his college from 1808 to 1809. Becoming a deacon of the Church of England in 1808, he was ordained as a priest in 1810 by Henry Bathurst, Bishop of Norwich. This was at a time when most academics at Oxford were obliged to lead celibate lives in college and had to resign their fellowships if they wished to marry.

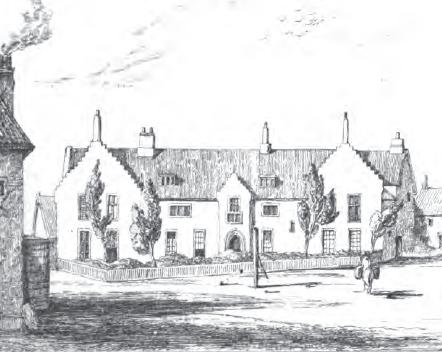
Holt Grammar School in 1838

Pulleyne was Master of Holt Grammar School from 1809 to 1857, the salary for which was £200 a year. Having held the post for 48 years, he remains the school's longest-serving head since its foundation in 1555. He was also Vicar of Sheringham from 1825 until his death, and of Weybourne from 1845. John William Burgon, in The Life and Times of Sir Thomas Gresham (1839), says

Holt school... is an ornament and a blessing to the county, and reflects much credit on the trustees and its worthy principal—the Rev. B. Pulleyne.

== Personal life ==
At the census of March 1851, Pulleyne was living at 38, Market Place, Holt, with his wife Rebecca, who was blind, his son Walter M. Pulleyne, aged 34, an apothecary, his daughter in law, his seven-year-old granddaughter Anne, and two servants. His wife, Rebecca Pulleyne, died at Holt on 13 March 1853. On 12 July of the same year, at Buckenham, Norfolk, Pulleyne married Mary Dinah Partridge, a farmer's daughter.

Having retired from his school, Pulleyne then lived at Sheringham, where he died in October 1861. He left a widow, Mary Dinah.
