= John Burrell (entomologist) =

English entomologist and clergyman

John Burrell (1762–1825) was an English entomologist and clergyman of the Church of England.

The son of another John Burrell, whom he eventually succeeded as Rector of Letheringsett, Norfolk, and the grandson of John Holmes, for thirty years Master of Holt School, Burrell was baptised at Letheringsett on 20 September 1762. He was educated by James Smith at Holt School before being admitted to the lists of Sidney Sussex College, Cambridge, on 6 July 1779. He matriculated in 1781, graduated BA in 1785, and proceeded to MA in 1791. On 22 May 1785 he was ordained a deacon at Norwich and a few months later, on 18 December, became a priest of the Church of England. In 1786 he succeeded his father as Rector and patron of Letheringsett, a benefice he held until his death.

Burrell published a Prodromus lepidopterorum Britannicorum and several papers on the moths, beetles, and true bugs of Norfolk. He was a Fellow of the Linnean Society and a Fellow of the Entomological Society of London. He contributed three papers to the first volume (1812) of the Transactions of this society.

Burrell was a close friend of John Curtis, William Kirby, Simon Wilkin, and William Spence, who all shared his interest in entomology.
