= Kimberley Halton-Farrow =

Kimberley Emma Halton-Farrow, previously Morrison (born 1987) is a British tri-athlete, banker, and business woman.

== Early life ==
Born in Norwich, Halton-Farrow spent much of her early years at Great Ormond Street Hospital, due to life-threatening heart problems. Aged three, she had complex open-heart surgery, which was successful.

In 1991, soon after this, she entered the pre-school of Gresham's School and stayed at Gresham's until 2006. She then studied mathematics at Loughborough University. At school, she took up the triathlon, but field hockey was her major sport. She continued to play at Loughborough and at the Teddington Hockey Club.

After graduating, she began her career in banking in London.

== Triathlete ==
Inspired by Chrissie Wellington, after four years in banking Halton-Farrow took a career break to make a serious attempt at the world of the competitive triathlon, and had speedy success. She represented Great Britain in the World Triathlon Championship Series and at the World Duathlon Championships, and in 2014 won the Europe Triathlon Championships 25-29 in Kitzbühel, Austria. Towards the end of 2015, she joined the ranks of professional athletes and in 2016 won her first Ironman 70.3 Triathlon title in Buenos Aires, Argentina. She won again in Galveston, Texas, in April 2017, came third in Staffordshire in June 2017, won again in Finland in June 2018, and shortly after that came second in the Swedish Ironman 70.3. In 2025, she still held a British Triathlete Pro Licence.

In 2020, she took the bronze medal in the National Cycling TT Championships at the ten-mile distance.

== Later career ==
Halton-Farrow joined Wensum Pools, a family company in South Raynham, Norfolk, which builds swimming pools. In 2022 she launched Wensum Water Retreats, to provide holidays with swimming facilities, and as of 2024 was its manager.

In 2022, Halton-Farrow spoke of the benefits of swimming while pregnant. In 2024, twelve weeks after giving birth, she won the women's swimming leg of the Norfolk Superhero event.
