= Christopher J. Monckton =

English musician (born 1954)

Christopher John Monckton (born 23 March 1954 in Ipswich, England), is a conductor, singer, organ recitalist and accompanist.

The son of an eye surgeon, Monckton was educated at Gresham's School (where he learnt to play the organ), and Magdalen College, Oxford (where he held a choral scholarship and read English). Graduating from Oxford in 1976 he attended a Law School in Guildford, Surrey. A further scholarship in literature and the fine arts took him to a cultural foundation at Vence in France. He became organist of the Basilica of Notre Dame de Nice, taught music at a choir school for boys in Grasse, and studied music at the Nice Conservatoire.

He has performed (as a solo singer, organist, and conductor) in almost every western and central European country. His performances in the British Isles include a song recital at St John's, Smith Square, and St Patrick's Cathedral in Dublin. He is based mainly in France.

Monckton also lectures around the world. In 2005, he formed a travel company, Thomas Martlet Ltd, to organize cultural tours to places of artistic, architectural and musical interest.
