= Simon Wilkin =

English publisher, literary scholar and naturalist

Simon Wilkin (27 July 1790, in Costessey − 1862, in London) was an English publisher, literary scholar and naturalist whose main interest was entomology.

== Life ==
He was the second of the three children of William Wilkin Wilkin (1762–1799), a Norfolk gristmiller, and Cecilia Lucy Wilkin (d. 1796), daughter of William Jacomb of London. When his father died Wilkin moved to Norwich to live with his guardian, Joseph Kinghorn, who educated him. He was a close friend of John Curtis, William Kirby, John Burrell and William Spence who shared his interest in entomology.

Wilkin lost his inherited wealth in 1811 when the paper mill in which he was a partner failed, and in 1832 his guardian's death was another financial disaster. Bankruptcy forced the sale of his insect collection to the Zoological Society of London. He was then able to establish a printing and publishing business in Norwich. He published the work of Harriet Martineau, Amelia Opie, George Borrow, and William Taylor. In 1825 he married Emma, daughter of John Culley of Costessey, and they had two daughters and a son and in 1834 they moved to London.

Wilkin spent thirteen years compiling a complete edition of Sir Thomas Browne (1835-6; reissued in 1846 and 1852), for which he researched Browne's correspondence in the British Museum and Bodleian Library. This edition was said by Robert Southey to be "the best reprint in the English language". His book collection of Browne was donated to the City of Norwich in 1905. They are held at the Norfolk Heritage Centre in The Forum, Norwich as The Wilkin Collection.

He was a Fellow of the Linnean Society, and a member of the Wernerian Society of Edinburgh.
