= Frank Wright =

Frank Wright, sometimes but not always an abbreviation of Francis Wright, may refer to:

== Entertainment ==
- Frank Wright (artist) (1860–1923), New Zealand artist
- Frank Wright (jazz musician) (1935–1990), free jazz saxophonist
- Frank Wright (painter) (1932–2020), American painter
- Frank Wright Jr. (1912–2008), American commercial artist
- Tré Cool (Frank Edwin Wright III, born 1972), drummer of Green Day

== Sports ==
- Frank Wright (cricketer, born 1807) (1807–1891), English cricketer
- Frank Wright (cricketer, born 1844) (1844–1924), English cricketer
- Frank Wright (cricketer, born 1870) (1870–1943), English cricketer
- Frank Wright (sport shooter) (1878–1931), American sport shooter
- Frank Wright (footballer) (1898–?), English footballer
- Frank I. Wright (1921–1992), American Thoroughbred horse racing trainer and television commentator
- Frank Wright (rugby union)

== Other ==
- Frank Lloyd Wright (1867–1959), American architect
- Frank Wright (historian) (1938–2003), in Las Vegas
- Frank Wright, co-founder of A&W Restaurants

== See also ==
- Francis Wright (disambiguation)
- Frances Wright (disambiguation)
