= Richard D'Aeth =

British educationalist

Hugh Richard Xenophon D'Aeth (3 June 1912 – 19 February 2008) was a British educationalist and President of Hughes Hall, Cambridge, from 1978 to 1984.

== Early life ==
D'Aeth was born in Vancouver, British Columbia, the son of Walter D'Aeth and Marion Turnbull. He was educated at Bedford School and Emmanuel College, Cambridge. At Emmanuel, he was a scholar and took a first class Honours degree in Natural Science before completing his PhD.

== Career ==
D'Aeth's first job was as a schoolmaster at Gresham's School in Norfolk, from 1938 to 1940, after which he served in the Royal Air Force during the Second World War. In 1946 he was appointed one of Her Majesty's Inspectors of Schools. In 1952 he took up an appointment as the Professor of Education at the University College of the West Indies and in 1958 returned to the United Kingdom as the first full Professor of Education at the young Exeter University, where he remained until a merger with St Luke's College in 1978 created a new School of Education. He was then appointed as President of Hughes Hall, Cambridge, where he remained for six years. He was also a Commonwealth Fellow at Harvard University and retired to Stoke Gabriel, near Totnes, Devon in 1984.

== Publications ==
D'Aeth's most significant publication was his Education and Development in the Third World (Farnborough, UK: Saxon House Press; Lexington, Mass: Lexington Books, 1975).
