= Robert Heath (mathematician) =

Robert Heath (died 1779) was an English army officer, mathematician, and periodical editor.

== Life ==
Heath was a captain in the British Army, and was described late in life as a "half-pay captain of invalids". For a time he served with his regiment in the Scilly Isles. He tried to establish a Palladium Society, under his own control.

== The Ladies' Diary ==
Heath is best known as a contributor to The Ladies' Diary, from 1737. He was taken onto the staff, and proposed the prize essays for 1739, 1740, 1742, 1746, and 1748. When Henry Beighton, editor of the Diary, died in October 1743, the proprietors, the Stationers' Company, allowed Beighton's widow to run it with Heath as her deputy. In that capacity Heath exercised full editorial control from 1744 to 1753, and continued to write under his own and assumed names.

A personal quarrel with Thomas Simpson led Heath to denigrate in print Simpson's Doctrine of Ultimators (1750) and Doctrine of Fluxions (1751), while praising related works on the same subject by William Emerson. John Turner, who like Emerson was a contributor to the Diary, inserted in his Mathematical Exercises (1750–3) a defence of Simpson against Heath, signed "Honestus". In 1753 the Stationers' Company dismissed Heath and installed Simpson in the editorial chair.

== Works ==
John Holmes and his Greek grammar were attacked by Heath and Robert Hankinson in a controversy from the period 1738–40. Holmes wrote in his own defence, and had support from Thomas Simpson. Heath also published on the longitude problem. He had a reputation for indecent writing and innuendo in the Town and Country Magazine and The Rambler's Magazine.

While editor of the Ladies' Diary, Heath started in 1749 a journal on similar lines of his own account, The Palladium, which then ran for nearly 30 years, to 1778, under changing titles. It was said that he poached for it better contributions sent to him as editor of the Diary.

Heath wrote A History of the Islands of Scilly, with a Tradition of the Land called Lioness, and a General Account of Cornwall. The book, published in London in 1750, and dedicated to the Duke of Cumberland, included a new map of the isles, drawn by Heath from a survey made in 1744; it was reprinted in 1808 in John Pinkerton's Voyages and Travels, ii. 729–784. His other works included:

- The Practical Arithmetician, 1750.
- Truth Triumphant: or Fluxions for the Ladies, 1752; part of the controversy with Simpson and Turner.
- The Ladies' Chronologer, No. I. 1754 (amalgamated with the Palladium of 1755).
- The Ladies' Philosopher, No. I. 1752, II. 1753, III. 1754.
- Astronomia Accurata; or the Royal Astronomer and Navigator, 1760.
- General and Particular Account of the Annular Eclipse of the Sun which happened on Sunday, April 1, 1764.

== Notes ==
Attribution

This article incorporates text from a publication now in the public domain: Stephen, Leslie; Lee, Sidney, eds. (1891). "Heath, Robert (d.1779)". Dictionary of National Biography. Vol. 25. London: Smith, Elder & Co.
