= Graeme Fife =

English writer, playwright and broadcaster

Graeme Fife (born 1946) is an English writer, playwright and broadcaster. His first career was as a schoolmaster and university lecturer.

== Early life ==
Born in 1946 in St Pancras, London, Fife is the son of John Fife and his wife Muriel H. Lickorish. He was educated at schools in Greater London and then at the University of Durham, where he graduated with first class in Greek language and literature.

== Teaching career ==
Fife taught Classics for one year at a school in Lancashire, then from 1970 to 1978 was Head of Classics at Gresham's School, Holt, and later a lecturer in Greek and Roman literature at the University of Reading.

== Reception ==
In July 1999, The Independent named Fife's Tour de France: The History, the Legend, the Riders as its book of the week. The Times later ranked it as one of its top five sports books of the year.

Reviewing Fife's The Terror: the Shadow of the Guillotine (2003) in The Independent, William Doyle called it "The most authoritative treatment we are likely to have for many years."

Of his book Arthur the King about the Arthurian legends, Gwyn A Williams, distinguished Welsh historian and former professor of history at University College Cardiff wrote: 'Much of what Fife wrote was new to me; what wasn't was conveyed more effectively than anything else I have read. From Fife's book, in both my own book and the television series I made, I got Camelot losing its glamour after Jerusalem fell and all that valuable detail of knighthood the book delves into (usually buried in academic tomes) .If I'd been permitted footnotes, Fife would have been all over the first Section of my book.'

In 1997, Fife wrote to The Independent to correct it on the origin of the word "clitoris".

== Publications ==
As well as books, Fife has written plays, talks, and stories for BBC Radio.

His novel Angel of the Assassination (2009) is a fictionalized account of the life of Charlotte Corday.

This novel was rewritten and now titled No Common Assassin, available on Amazon

=== Books ===
- Polly Polestar (Ginn & Co., 1989)
- The Wrong Side of the Bed (Ginn & Co., 1988) ISBN 0-602-28462-7
- Story in anthology: The Man in Black (1990)
- Arthur the King: a study of mediaeval romance in its social, literary and historical context (BBC Books, 1990, ISBN 0-563-21510-0
- George Francis: Trainer of Champions (with George Francis, Mainstream, 1998, ISBN 1-84018-059-5)
- Tour de France: the history, the legend, the riders (Mainstream, 1999, ISBN 1-84018-918-5)
- Tour de France: Tour de Souffrance (translated from the French of Albert Londres, Cycle Sport, 1999)
- Inside the Peloton: Riding, Winning and Losing the Tour de France (2001, ISBN 1-84018-672-0)
- The Terror: The Shadow of the Guillotine, France 1792–1794 (Portrait, 2003, ISBN 0-7499-5005-6)
- Bob Chicken: A Passion for the Bike (2005, ISBN 0-9551225-0-3)
- Great Road Climbs of the Pyrenees (Rapha, 2006)
- The Beautiful Machine (2007, ISBN 1-84596-241-9)
- Massif Guide to the Great Road Climbs of the Pyrenees (2008) ISBN 9780955825408
- Angel of the Assassination (novel) (Merit, 2009)
- Great Road Climbs of the Southern Alps (Rapha, 2010)
- Brian Robinson, Pioneer (Mousehold Press 2010)
- Great Road Climbs of the Northern Alps (Rapha 2011)
- The Elite Bicycle: a Portrait of the World's Greatest Bicycles (2013) ISBN 9781937715083
- Memory's Ransom The Conrad Press 2024 a novel based on a true story told to the author
- Two of the Mountains books originally published by Rapha now published by Thames and Hudson

=== Plays ===
- Praise Be to God (performed by Edward de Souza Orange Tree, London, 1987)
- Reg (performed by Edward de Souza, Orange Tree, 1987)
- The Great French Revolution Show (Deià, 1984)
- Lysistrata by Aristophanes (translated and adapted, Deià, 1984)
- The Silver Nutmeg (musical, with Peter Thorne)
- Grimaldi (musical drama, with Peter Thorne)
- Once Upon a Time... (dramatic song sequence for narrator and singers, with Peter Thorne)
- The Andria (translation from The Andria of Terence, with Sebastian Eden) (Gresham's School)
- The Weaker Sex (Southampton)
- Gesualdo (Edinburgh, London, Melbourne)
- Mr Shakespeare...Mr Liebowitz (Deià)
- Jam (London, Edinburgh, Swindon)
- The Door (opera) France

=== Screenplays ===
- Chavasse Park (promotional film for architectural development in Liverpool)
- Ghosts of Deptford (six short films about celebrated denizens of Deptford)

=== Radio Scripts ===
- Elias Howe
- Some thirty Stories about composers, Monologues and Duologues
- Snipe 3909
- Earth to Earth
- Vivaldi
- Revolutionary Portraits
- The Whisper of the Axe
- Arthur the King
- La Mogador
- The March of the Ten Thousand
- The Misfortune at Seaham
- A Breath of Fresh Air
- Pearls Go with Pearls (script consultant)
- Godslots
- Surviving Wagner
- St Cecilia of Sicilia
- Wilf
- Cat's Whiskers, six short playlets
- The Figaro Letters
- The Athenian Trireme
- Doggett's Coat and Badge
- The Night Stairs
- Timbuktu: Drowning in Sand
- Vegetarian Cyclists
- Bikesongs
- Bicycle Music
- Saint-Saëns, Samson et Dalila and the Lost Glory
- The Fighting Temeraire, The Battle and the Breeze
- The Sweetness of the Garden
- Spem in Alium
- Beau Geste (adapted for R4 Classic Serial)
- Robert Graves and Myth R3 Essays
- many scripts for Pause for Thought
- Several contributions to From Our Own Correspondent

== Other ==
- 'The View from the Oarbench' in Frank Welsh, Building the Trireme (Constable, 1988)
