= Glyn Barnett =

British sport shooter

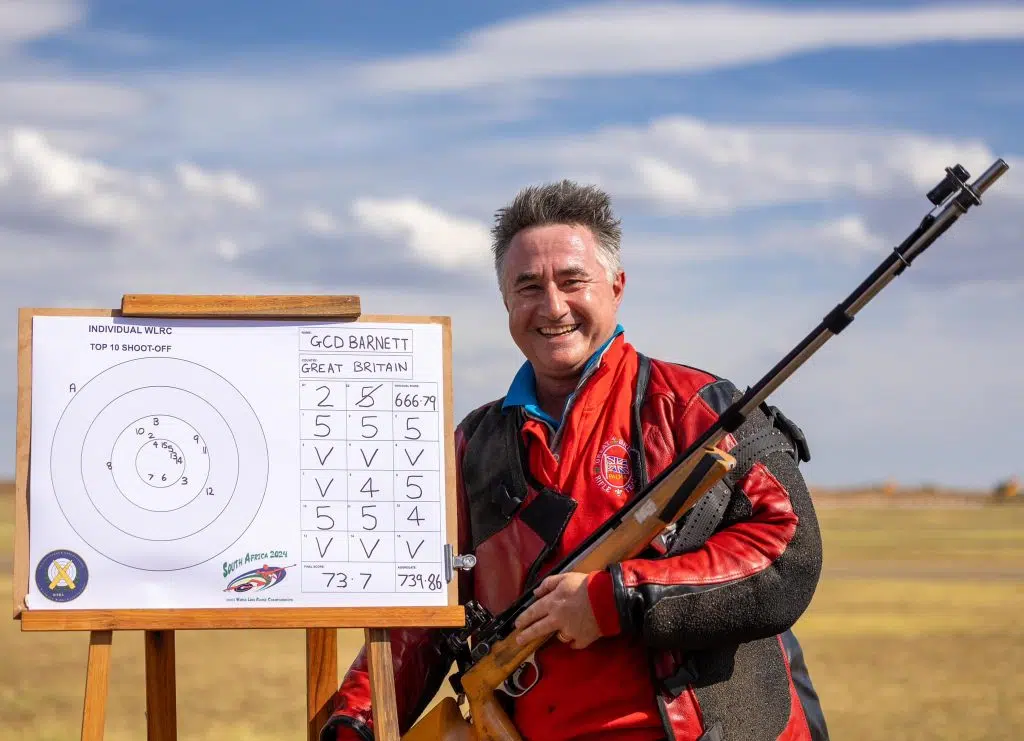
- Barnett in March 2024

Personal information
- Full name: Glyn Cawley Daer Barnett
- Nationality: (United Kingdom) British
- Born: 1 December 1970 (age 55) Bradford, West Riding of Yorkshire

Sport
- Country: (United Kingdom) Great Britain
- Sport: Shooting
- Event: Fullbore target rifle
Medal record
Sports shooting
Representing England
Commonwealth Games
Silver medal – second place	1994 Victoria	fullbore rifle
Bronze medal – third place	1994 Victoria	fullbore rifle pair
Bronze medal – third place	2002 Manchester	fullbore rifle
Gold medal – first place	2006 Melbourne	fullbore rifle

Glyn Cawley Daer Barnett (born 1 December 1970), is a male British international rifleman who won a shooting gold medal at the 2006 Commonwealth Games in Melbourne.

== Sport shooting career ==
From 1981 to 1989, Barnett attended Gresham's School, Holt, Norfolk, where he first took up full-bore rifle shooting as a serious sport.

While at school, he represented Gresham's in the schools' shooting championships at Bisley.

During his student years he shot for the University of London, Norfolk, England, and Great Britain. He took part in his first World Championships representing Great Britain in 1992.

His first Commonwealth Games representing England came in 1994, in Victoria, British Columbia. He won a bronze medal in the fullbore rifle singles and a silver medal in the pairs. At the Manchester Commonwealth Games in 2002, he won a bronze medal in the pairs, shooting with Jane Messer. He won HM the Queen's Prize in 2002 and again in 2003, becoming the first person to win the prize in consecutive years. This feat was equalled by David Calvert in 2015/2016.

Selected again for the Commonwealth Games at Melbourne in 2006, he shot in the full-bore rifle pairs competition in partnership with Dr Parag Patel (the youngest man ever to win the Canadian Open Championships). Together they took the gold medal. Barnett commented "None of this would be possible without the support of family, friends, psychologists, coaches, and work colleagues."

== Medical career ==
From 1990 to 1996, Barnett trained as a doctor at London's Charing Cross and Westminster Medical School, now the Imperial College School of Medicine. He was an Emergency Medicine Consultant at Charing Cross in London from 2006, and has since moved overseas in 2009 with his family.
