= Richard Hand =

Richard Anthony Hand (27 November 1960 – 26 March 2011), was an English classical guitarist.

== Education ==
Hand was educated from 1972 to 1977 at Gresham's School, Holt (where he first learnt to play the guitar), and the Royal Academy of Music, where he was an open scholar and won the Julian Bream Prize, the String Players' Award and the Recital Diploma.

== Career ==
On graduating, he joined the 'Live Music Now' scheme with flautist Ileana Ruhemann, broadcasting frequently on BBC Radio 3.

With Tom Dupré, as the 'Hand-Dupré guitar duo', he performed in London at the Wigmore Hall, Purcell Room, and St John's, Smith Square, around the U.K., and in more than twenty other countries, particularly the United States. Hand and Dupré have broadcast together on television and radio and have premiered works by composers such as Edward Cowie, David Bedford and Jonathan Lloyd.

As a concerto soloist, Hand premiered many solo works, including compositions of Martin Butler and Peter Dickinson.

He was leader of the English Guitar Quartet from 1996, playing Treble Guitar 1. With the EGQ he toured widely in the UK and to Israel in 1998, and was responsible for major commissions such as ‘Kandinsky’ by Edward Cowie which was performed at St. Giles Cripplegate, London, live on the BBC at the composer’s 60th birthday tribute concert. With the EGQ he also recorded on composer Barry Mills’ album Summer Waves on the Claudio label. He also performed with the Pro Arte Guitar Trio. As an ensemble player, he played in many arenas including the BBC Proms, and toured France, Spain, South Africa and Kenya with 'Tetra' and the Alibas flute and guitar duo.

Richard Hand had a long-established duo with the flautist, Jennifer Stinton. They met as students at the Royal Academy of Music in 1982, and continued to work together for the next 28 years. They performed in Festivals and Concert Halls throughout the country and gave a successful and sold-out Wigmore Hall recital in 2007, which resulted in the launch of their album, Hidden Tango on the Cadenza Label.

== Honours ==
- Associate of the Royal Academy of Music

== Sources ==
- Old Greshamian Club Book (Cheverton & Son Ltd, Cromer, 1999)
