= Francis Wright (cricketer) =

Australian cricketer

Personal information
- Born: 13 March 1874; Ballarat East, Victoria, Australia
- Died: 10 October 1899 (aged 25); Ballarat East, Victoria, Australia

Domestic team information
- Years: Team
- 1898: Victoria
- Source: Cricinfo, 27 July 2015

Francis Wright (13 March 1874 – 10 October 1899) was an Australian cricketer. He played one first-class cricket match for Victoria in 1898.

== See also ==
- List of Victoria first-class cricketers
