= C. V. Durell =

English schoolmaster and mathematician

Clement Vavasor Durell (born 6 June 1882, Fulbourn, Cambridgeshire, died South Africa, 10 December 1968) was an English schoolmaster who wrote mathematical textbooks.

== Background and early life ==
A son of John Vavasor Durell (1837–1923), Rector of Fulbourn, Cambridgeshire, and his wife Ellen Annie Carlyon, Durell had four older brothers. He was educated at Felsted School and Clare College, Cambridge (1900–1904), where he gained a first class in part two of the mathematics tripos and was seventh wrangler.

== Career ==
- Assistant master at Gresham's School, Holt, 1904–1905
- Assistant master at Winchester College, 1910
- Lieutenant in Royal Garrison Artillery during First World War
- Mentioned in Dispatches
- Housemaster of Chernocke House, Winchester College, 1920–1927

In 1900 he joined the Mathematical Association and in the 1900s was contributing articles on teaching to its journal, The Mathematical Gazette. After the First World War, he found a substantial second career and income in writing textbooks.

After spending most of his career teaching and writing about mathematics at Winchester, Durell retired to East Preston, Sussex, wintering in Madeira and South Africa, where he died in 1968.

His estate at death amounted to £200,098, which in the 1960s was a large fortune for the son of a clergyman to amass as a schoolmaster.

== Books ==
Durell's textbooks were hugely successful from the 1920s, and by 1935 his publisher, G. Bell & Sons, was claiming:

There can indeed be few secondary schools in the English-speaking world in which some at least of Mr Durell's books are not now employed in the teaching of mathematics.

He collaborated on books with masters from other schools, such as R. M. Wright of Eton, A. W. Siddons of Harrow, C. O. Tuckey of Charterhouse, Alan Robson of Marlborough and G. W. Palmer of Christ's Hospital.

Durell's books cover all areas of school mathematics, including algebra, calculus, mechanics, geometry, and trigonometry, and include:

- Elementary Problem Papers (Arnold, London, 1906)
- Readable Relativity (G. Bell & Sons, 1926)
- The Teaching of Elementary Algebra (G. Bell & Sons, 1931)
- General Arithmetic (G. Bell & Sons, 1936)
- Elementary Geometry (G. Bell & Sons, 1948) First published 1925
