= Hugh Wright (schoolmaster) =

English schoolmaster and educationalist

Hugh Raymond Wright (born 24 August 1938) is an English schoolmaster and educationalist who was chairman of the Headmasters' Conference for 1995–1996.

In his early career Wright taught at Brentwood School and Cheltenham College, where he was Head of Classics. He was then successively headmaster of Stockport Grammar School, Gresham's School, and King Edward's School, Birmingham.

== Early life ==
The son of the Rev. Raymond Blayney Wright and his wife Alice Mary Hawksworth, Wright was educated at Kingswood School, Bath, from 1949 to 1957 and The Queen's College, Oxford, where he was a Bible Clerk and graduated BA and later MA in Literae Humaniores.

== Career ==
His first post was as an assistant schoolmaster at Brentwood School, from 1961 to 1964. From 1964 to 1979, he taught at Cheltenham College, where he was Head of Classics from 1967 to 1972 and housemaster of Boyne House, 1971 to 1979. His first appointment as a headmaster came at Stockport Grammar School, from 1979, and in 1985 he became head of Gresham's School, Holt, remaining there until 1991. Finally he was Chief Master of King Edward's School, Birmingham, from 1991 to 1998.

He was elected Chairman of the Headmasters' Conference in 1995, a year before it became the Headmasters' and Headmistresses' Conference, having previously chaired its North West District from 1983 and its Community Service Sub-Committee from 1985 to 1990.

In Birmingham in the mid-1990s, Wright worked with Tim Brighouse, the city's chief education officer, to develop a partnership between King Edward's and the state sector of education, commenting "We are looking at a new era of public-private co-operation reinforcing the community base. We are talking about one-off initiatives, not grandiose schemes". He chaired a group called the 'Children's University', providing Saturday schools, and a summer literacy scheme for eleven-year-olds held at King Edward's in 1997.

== Other appointments ==
- Admiralty Interview Board Panel, 1982–95
- Church of England Advisory Board of Ministry (formerly Advisory Council for the Church's Ministry), 1982–
- Chairman of National Steering Committee for Children's University, 1995–2001
- Member of Bloxham Project Committee, 1993–1998, and Trustee, 1998–2006
- Chairman of Governors, Kingswood School, Bath, 1998–2006 (and governor, 1995–1998)
- Member of Governing Bodies Association Committee, 2000–03
- Member of Chaplaincy Team, Shepton Mallet Prison, 2001–

== Publications ==
- The Origins of Christianity and the Medieval Church (1980)
- Auden and Gresham's in Conference Common Room, Vol. 44, No. 2, Summer 2007

== Private life ==
In 1962, Wright married Jillian Mary McIldowie Meiklejohn, and they have three sons.

He is a member of the East India Club and gives his recreations in Who's Who as "music, theatre, hill walking, wildfowl, gardening, Rugby football".
