= Douglas Robb (schoolmaster) =

English schoolmaster (born 1970)

Douglas Robert Kenneth Robb (born 3 September 1970) is an English schoolmaster who is currently headmaster of Gresham's School. Before that, he was a housemaster at Oundle School and Loughborough Grammar School, and then head of Oswestry School.

== Early life ==
Born in the Wirral in 1970, the son of Dr Derek Robb and the youngest of his parents' three children, Robb was a choirboy at St Saviour's Church, Oxton. He was subsequently educated at Birkenhead School, where he was in the First XV, the school's rugby union team. He gained an MA in Politics in 1994 from the University of Edinburgh, where he was President of the Edinburgh University Rugby Football Club.

== Career ==
Robb began his teaching career in Zimbabwe, teaching Economics at Prince Edward School, Harare, from 1994 to 1996. After a severe motorcycling accident in Harare, which led to sepsis, he returned to Britain and was a rugby coach at Fettes College in Scotland from 1996 to 1997. He then spent a year at the Moray House School of Education, where he gained a Postgraduate Certificate in Education in Economics, and taught Economics at Loughborough Grammar School for two years. Following this Robb spent ten years at Oundle School, where he taught Government and Politics from 2000 to 2010, and served as Housemaster of Bramston House for eight of those years. While at Oundle, he enrolled at the University of Cambridge and gained the degree of Master of Education in 2009. In 2010 he was appointed as Headmaster of Oswestry School in Shropshire, and in September 2014 transferred as head to Gresham's School, Holt, Norfolk.

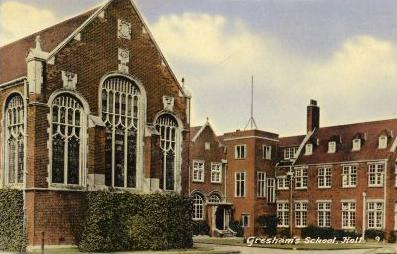
Gresham’s School

In his present role, Robb has said that "This job is a vocation... in term time, successful teachers must be prepared to involve themselves far beyond the classroom itself, including meetings at odd times".

In February 2018, Robb came to national attention with a blog in which he was critical of millennials, their sense of entitlement, and their lack of grit. He added later "We try as a school not to molly-coddle our students". The Times made a headline out of his comment "If your child is a lazy toerag then I’m going to tell them". It also noted that while he was in charge of a town-centre house at Oundle, which suffered from drunks in the street, Robb had been in the habit of "brandishing a cricket bat at rowdies... sometimes dressed only in his boxer shorts. He is 6ft 5in with a rugby player’s build. One assumes this did the trick." One former pupil responded: "Negative stereotypes of millennials are two a penny and you don’t have to look far to find them", while another claimed "As Gresham’s does cost £34,000-a-year, the headmaster of the boarding school may simply be in a privileged bubble".

Robb made positive remarks about Greta Thunberg in April 2019, but was critical of "the trendy hypocrisy that emanates from some politicians and high profile role-models". He supported young people’s right to demonstrate and to involve themselves in debates about world issues, while noting "the irony of airline tycoon Richard Branson's proposed strategy to tackle climate change". In the same month, he gave a cautious welcome to the new Ofsted inspection framework, suggesting that schoolteachers could feel liberated by it.

Robb responded in April 2020 to the cancellation of school GCSE and A-Level examinations, as part of the British government’s response to the COVID-19 pandemic, by commenting that "Some students are good at exams, so a terminal assessment really suits them, and other pupils really struggle. So, if this prompts debate and conversation about that, it might be a silver lining to what’s been a pretty dark cloud."

In September 2020, Robb was announced as one of the five nominees in the "Best head of a public school" category of the Tatler Schools Awards, together with Mark Turnbull of Giggleswick, Emma McKendrick of Downe House, Antony Wallersteiner of Stowe, and Jane Lunnon of Wimbledon High School. The award was won by Lunnon.

On 30 January 2021, Robb responded in The Daily Telegraph to its recent story "Top private school ‘tarnishes’ its own history with move to honour Cambridge Five spy with blue plaque". He said there had been no attempt to pass moral judgment and added "We cannot deny that Donald Maclean attended Gresham’s, despite the harm he caused."

Since 2016 Robb has been a Trustee of the Thornton-Smith and Plevins Trust, which makes educational grants to young people in distressed circumstances aged between sixteen and nineteen.

In September 2025, Tatler shortlisted Gresham's for its Tatler Schools Awards 2026 "Best Public School" title, together with Eton, Brighton College, Canford, and Caterham School. In October, it was announced that Gresham's had won the title. Robb commented "This has been an extraordinary year for Gresham's in what is a very tough climate for many independent schools".

== Personal life ==
Robb married Lucinda McFerran the year after his return from Africa and with her has three children. His reported interests are travel, shooting, skiing, golf, and team and racquet sports.
