= Antony Clark =

Antony Roy Clark (born 7 November 1956) is a South African schoolmaster and educationalist, formerly a first-class cricketer, currently Rector (headmaster) of Michaelhouse, KwaZulu-Natal.

== Early life ==
Born at Grahamstown, Cape Province, South Africa, in 1956, Clark is the son of Roger and Betty Clark. He was educated at St. Andrew's College, Grahamstown, and Rhodes University, where he graduated BA and HDE, then at Downing College, Cambridge, where he held the Douglas Smith Scholarship and graduated MA in 1981. At Cambridge he, on occasion, played for Cambridge University Cricket Club and was president of the Downing College MCR.

== Schoolmaster ==
Clark taught at Westerford High School, Cape Town, from 1984 to 1990. He then worked at Liberty Life before being appointed as Headmaster of St Joseph's Marist College, Cape Town, in 1992 and of his own old school, St Andrew's College, in 1994. In 2002 he moved as head to Gresham's School in Norfolk, England. Thereafter in 2008, he was appointed at Malvern College in Worcestershire for his fourth headship.

In 2019, Clark became the Rector of Michaelhouse in Balgowan, South Africa. This is his fifth headship.

== Private life ==
In 1981, Clark married Dr Brigitte Jennifer Lang, and they have one son and two daughters.

He gives his recreations in the British Who's Who as cricket, squash, chess, reading, and hiking.
