= Francis Wright (academic) =

English clergyman and schoolmaster

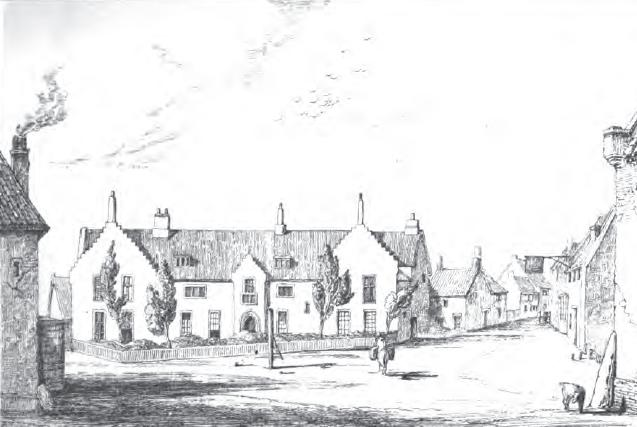
Sir John Gresham's Grammar School

Francis Wright (c. 1610 – c. 5 February 1659) was an English Church of England clergyman, Oxford don, and schoolmaster.

Born in Buckinghamshire, Wright was the son of the Rev. Richard Wright, of Everdon, Northamptonshire. He matriculated at Merton College, Oxford, on 31 January 1628, aged nineteen, graduated BA on 30 April 1629, became a fellow of his college in 1630, and proceeded to MA in 1634. This was at a time when most academics at Oxford were obliged to lead celibate lives in college and had to resign if they wished to marry.

In 1646, Wright was appointed by the Worshipful Company of Fishmongers as Master of Sir John Gresham’s Grammar School in Holt, Norfolk, where he remained until his death in 1659, teaching mostly Latin and Ancient Greek.

He was buried at Holt on 6 February 1658/59.
