= Peter Lloyd (mountaineer) =

British mountain climber

Peter Lloyd CBE (26 June 1907 – 11 April 2003), was a mountaineer and engineer, a President of the Alpine Club.

== Early life ==
Lloyd was born in Sheffield, England, the son of an economics lecturer. He was educated at Gresham's School, Holt, from 1921 to 1924, and then read Engineering at Trinity College, Cambridge. While there, he was president of the university's Mountaineering Club.

== Climber ==
He continued with his climbing and became an experienced alpinist in the late 1920s and early 1930s. In 1936, he was chosen for the British–American Himalayan Expedition Nanda Devi, led by Bill Tilman, who called him "first-rate on rock and ice".

In 1938, Tilman assembled a team for an attempt on Mount Everest, and again he chose Lloyd. This expedition reached a height of 27,200 feet.

Lloyd used his engineering skills to work on oxygen equipment for high-altitude climbing, favouring a system which used ordinary air as well as cylinder oxygen. He thus contributed greatly to John Hunt's successful ascent of Mount Everest in 1953, commenting on the oxygen question - "I have a lot of sympathy with the sentimental objection to its use, and would rather see the mountain climbed without it than with; but, on the other hand, I would rather see the mountain climbed with it than not climbed at all." Lloyd was also a member of the Joint Himalayan Committee, which organised and financed the expedition.

He was President of the Alpine Club from 1977 to 1980 and delivered a moving oration at the memorial service in 1978 of Bill Tilman, who was lost at sea in the south Atlantic at the age of 79.

== Career ==
After Cambridge, Lloyd worked as an engineer on furnace design for the Gas Light and Coke Company in London.

At the outbreak of World War II in 1939, Lloyd found he was prevented from active military service by having a reserved occupation, and he joined the Royal Aircraft Establishment, working on defences against low-flying aircraft. He then joined Hayne Constant's team working to develop gas turbine engines. In 1943, they produced a prototype jet engine before merging with Sir Frank Whittle's Power Jets group.

After the War, Lloyd became head of the combustion department of the National Gas Turbine Establishment, and in 1950 he was appointed as its deputy director. From 1961 until 1969, he was the director-general of the Ministry of Aviation's Research and Development division, later heading the UK defence research and supply staff in Australia. At the Ministry of Aviation, he was closely involved in the design of the Rolls-Royce Spey and Tay engines, and the Bristol/Rolls-Royce Pegasus engine which powers the vertical take-off BAE Sea Harrier.

== Retirement ==
After his retirement, Lloyd emigrated to Australia, settling in Queensland, where he died in Toowoomba.

== Family ==
Lloyd was married twice and had one son and one daughter from his first marriage.
