= Frances Wright (disambiguation) =

Frances Wright (1795–1852) was a writer and reformer.

Frances Wright may also refer to:

- Frances Claudia Wright (1919–2010), Sierra Leonean lawyer
- Frances Kazan, née Frances Wright
- Frannie Wright on Holiday Ranch
- Frances Wright, political candidate for Calgary Centre
- Frances Woodworth Wright (1897–1989), American astronomer

== See also ==
- Frank Wright (disambiguation)
