= John Holmes (schoolmaster) =

John Holmes (1703 – 22 December 1760 in Holt, Norfolk) was an 18th-century schoolmaster and writer on education, Master of Gresham's School in Norfolk.

== Life ==
Holmes is described in a broadsheet of his Latin verses dating from 1729 as ex schola Holtensis.

In 1729, the Worshipful Company of Fishmongers, governors of Gresham's School, Holt, appointed Holmes Master (viz., headmaster) of the school with effect from 1730. This was an unusual appointment, as Holmes was not a clergyman.

Holmes was a successful schoolmaster, teaching classical and modern languages, oratory, and drama, and he reversed the school's decline under his predecessors. He soon found he needed to improve on the teaching materials he had inherited and decided to expand his career by writing and publishing school textbooks.

At Gresham's he pioneered the teaching of modern languages, especially French, as well as geography, and astronomy.

According to an advertisement in Holmes's Latin Grammar of 1732, Gresham's School under him taught

Arithmetic in all its parts, Bookkeeping by Double Entry... the Use of Globes and writing in all the hands used in Great Britain.

Holmes's headship was applauded by the Fishmongers' Company.

Critical pamphlets were aimed at his Greek Grammar, to which Holmes replied in letters to the press, using the pen-name Patroclus. The mathematician Thomas Simpson came out in his support. The attacks came from Robert Heath and Robert Hankinson, in a controversy from the period 1738–40.

He died at the age of fifty-seven and was buried at Holt.

== Books published ==
Holmes's works include:

- A New Grammar of the Latin Tongue... freed from the many obscurities, defects, superfluities, and errors, which render the common grammar an insufferable impediment to the progress of education (1732, thirteenth edition 1788)
- A Greek Grammar (1735, seventh edition by 1771)
- History of England, Performed by the Gentlemen of the Grammar School... at their Christmas breaking up (drama, published in Latin and English, 1737)
- The Art of Rhetorick made easy... to meet the needs of the time when schoolboys are expected to be led, sooth'd and entic'd to their studies … rather than by force and harsh discipline drove, as in days of yore (1738)
- Rhetorick Epitomiz'd, whereby the principles of the whole art may be learned in an hour (1738)
- Clavis grammaticalis... or, Examination of the Latin and Greek Grammars (1739)
- The Constellations Reformed (drama, 1741)
- The French Grammar, for the Use of Holt-School in Norfolk, compriz'd in a rational, clear, and concise Method (1741)
- The Grammarian's Geography and Astronomy, Ancient and Modern; Exemplified in the Use of the Globes Terraqueous and Celestial (1751)
- Astronomy Ancient and Modern (1751)
- The Grammarian's Arithmetic: a Compendious Treatise of the Art of Ciphering (1755, advertised but apparently not published)

== Family ==
Holmes's family background is unknown. His wife was called Jane Holmes and died in 1767. Their daughter Jane married John Burrell, Rector of Letheringsett and became the mother of John Burrell, a lepidopterist.
