= Matt Dickinson =

British filmmaker

Matt Dickinson is a film-maker and writer who is best known for his award-winning novels and his documentary work for National Geographic Television, Discovery Channel and the BBC. In 2003 he was the co-writer and director of Cloud Cuckoo Land—an independent British movie.

== Books ==
A partial list of books by Dickinson:

- Black Ice (2002)
- Bobby Moore: The Man in Full (2014)
- The Other Side of Everest (1999)
- The Death Zone: Climbing Everest Through the Killer Storm (1997)
- The Everest Files (2014)
- Everest: Triumph and Tragedy on the World's Highest Peak (2002)
