= Warin Foster Bushell =

Warin Foster Bushell FRAS

Headmaster of Birkenhead School
- In office 1930–1946

Rector of Michaelhouse
- In office 1927–1930

Headmaster of Solihull School
- In office 1920–1927

Personal details
- Born: 18 April 1885 Harrow, Middlesex, England
- Died: 21 November 1974 (aged 89) Birkenhead, Cheshire, England
- Occupation: Schoolmaster, mathematician

Warin Foster Bushell (18 April 1885 – 21 November 1974) was a schoolmaster and educationalist who was headmaster of leading schools in England and South Africa and a president of the Mathematical Association.

== Early life ==
Bushell was born at Harrow, Middlesex, the son of the Rev. William Done Bushell who for fifty years was an assistant master and Honorary chaplain at Harrow School, and also lord of the manor of Caldey Island, Pembrokeshire.

He was educated at Charterhouse School and King's College, Cambridge, graduating BA and MA.

== Career ==
Bushell's first post was as an assistant master at Gresham's School, Holt, from 1907 to 1912, after which he was Head of the Modern Side and a housemaster at Rossall School from 1912 to 1914. He returned to Rossall for two more years after serving in the Herefordshire Regiment in Palestine and the Western Front during the Great War of 1914–1918.

In 1920 Bushell was appointed headmaster of Solihull School, where he founded the Old Silhillians' Association for former pupils. The Association continues today in rude health. The concert hall at Solihull School bears his name. He remained at Solihull School until 1927. At Solihull, his foresight was critical to the school's expansion at its present large urban site of some sixty-five acres (260,000 m^{2}). In the 1920s, Bushell bought much of the land himself when the school's governors refused to do so. On his retirement, Bushell sold the land to the school at the price he had paid.

Upon leaving Solihull School, he went out for three years to South Africa as Rector of Michaelhouse, Natal, remaining until 1930. Finally, he was headmaster of Birkenhead School from 1930 to 1946. He taught mathematics, divinity and was active in the Officer Training Corps and athletics. He was president of the Wirral Athletic Club. On its 150th anniversary a brochure from the school described him as "arguably the most renowned and cherished headmaster in the school's history".

Bushell was elected a Fellow of the Royal Astronomical Society in 1908 and was president of the Mathematical Association in 1946–1947.

On his retirement from teaching, he became a lecturer on Commonwealth Studies, local history and many other topics, working for the Central Office of Information and the National Trust. He travelled extensively, painted and collected books.

He died at Birkenhead in 1974, in his ninetieth year. The main hall of Birkenhead School, sometimes used for public concerts, is named after him, as is the hall at Solihull School.

== Publications ==
Bushell's publications included his School Sermons (1950) and School Memories (1962) and also a variety of educational and archaeological articles.

== Private life ==
Bushell never married. He gave his recreation in the British Who's Who as "travelling" and was a member of the Royal Over-Seas League and the Royal Commonwealth Society.
