= J. R. Eccles =

English schoolmaster and author

James Ronald Eccles (9 January 1874 – 31 August 1956) was an English schoolmaster and author who was headmaster of Gresham's School, Holt.

Eccles was notable in the 1920s as an opponent of the use of corporal punishment.

== Early life ==
Eccles was the son of Richard Eccles, of The Elms, Lower Darwen, Lancashire, but his father died when he was only two. He was educated at home by a governess and then at St David's School, Reigate, and Clifton College, where he was a member of the First Eleven (cricket) and the First Fifteen (rugby union) and also edited the school magazine, The Cliftonian. He was admitted to King's College, Cambridge, on 2 October 1893. After taking a sabbatical year off in 1895 to travel in South Africa, Australia, and New Zealand, he returned to Cambridge and went on to take a double first in the Natural Science Tripos and was made an honorary exhibitioner of the college in 1897, graduating BA the same year and being promoted to MA by seniority in 1901.

== Career ==
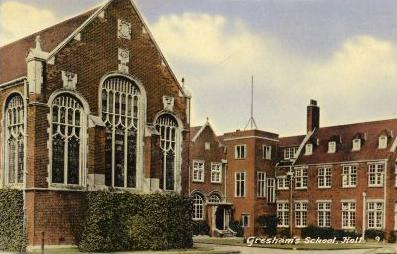
Gresham's in the time of Eccles

A Methodist and a Liberal, Eccles's first career plan had been to go on to train as a doctor, but instead after Cambridge he spent a year in South Wales studying its geology, then some months in Paris to improve his French, and then in 1899 became a schoolmaster by returning to his old school, Clifton, to teach Physics for a year while the post-holder was on leave. In 1900 he was appointed as a science master at Gresham's School, a small country school of which George Howson had just become head master, with instructions for a great expansion. In January 1903 he was commissioned as a Lieutenant into the 3rd Volunteer Battalion, the Norfolk Regiment, in connection with the school's cadet corps, and in September of that year the school's new buildings on the Cromer Road were opened. In 1907, Eccles became Second Master and he succeeded as headmaster on Howson's death in 1919. He continued to head the school until 1935.

In a biography of his pupil James Klugmann, Eccles is described as "a progressive headmaster, a critic of the competitive public school system who wanted to instil a sense of trust, loyalty, and a civic public service ethic among his pupils. The American Charles K. Taylor wrote admiringly of Eccles’s system of trust in The Outlook in 1927. However, W. H. Auden was deeply critical of the honours system as operated by Eccles, complaining that the encouragement of boys to inform on each other created a culture of fear. He wrote in Graham Greene’s anthology The Old School that "The best reason I have for opposing Fascism is that at school I lived in a Fascist state."

Eccles used much of his salary for improving the school. In February 1921 the Thatched Buildings, which he paid for, were opened by Sir Arthur Shipley, providing new classrooms which would allow for the teaching of new subjects.

Unusually, for his time, Eccles did not use corporal punishment in his school and discouraged its use by others. In March 1921 a letter from Eccles was published in The Times which condemned "corporal punishment of any kind". In 1924 he read a paper to the Conference of School Masters and College Tutors on School Discipline which made his case against beating.

Eccles actively looked for bright boys for his school, and two such in the 1920s were W. H. Auden and Benjamin Britten. He was "obsessed with punctuality and tidiness, particularly picking up litter". In January 1934, the school celebrated Eccles's one hundred terms as a master by giving him a leather-bound illuminated address and a silver bowl. Later in the year he retired, exhausted, but he lived on until 1956.

His obituary commented that his Puritanism could be irksome, but that "none could question his absolute sincerity".

== Selected publications ==
- J. R. Eccles, Lecture Notes on Light, with diagrams (Cambridge University Press, 1917)
- J. R. Eccles, Advanced Lecture Notes on Heat (Cambridge University Press, 1921)
- J. R. Eccles, My life as a public school master (n.d.)
