= George Howson (headmaster) =

George William Saul Howson MA (8 August 1860 – 7 January 1919) was an English schoolmaster and writer, notable as the reforming headmaster of Gresham's School from 1900 to 1919.

== Early life ==
Howson was one of the four sons of William Howson of Settle, headmaster of Penrith School and author of An Illustrated Guide to the Curiosities of Craven (1850); he was also the grandson of the Reverend J. Howson, second master of Giggleswick School, and was himself educated at Giggleswick, which he left in July 1879. From there, he proceeded to Merton College, Oxford, matriculating in 1879. In due course he graduated BA in 1883, taking a First in the Final Honours School of Natural Science, and MA in 1886.

All of his brothers attended Giggleswick School, Hubert Howson (born 1857) becoming a lawyer and settling in New York City, and Charles James Howson (born 1852) becoming a bank manager and Justice of the Peace at Chesterfield. His uncle John Howson was also a schoolmaster and principal of Liverpool College from 1849 to 1865.

== Schoolmaster ==
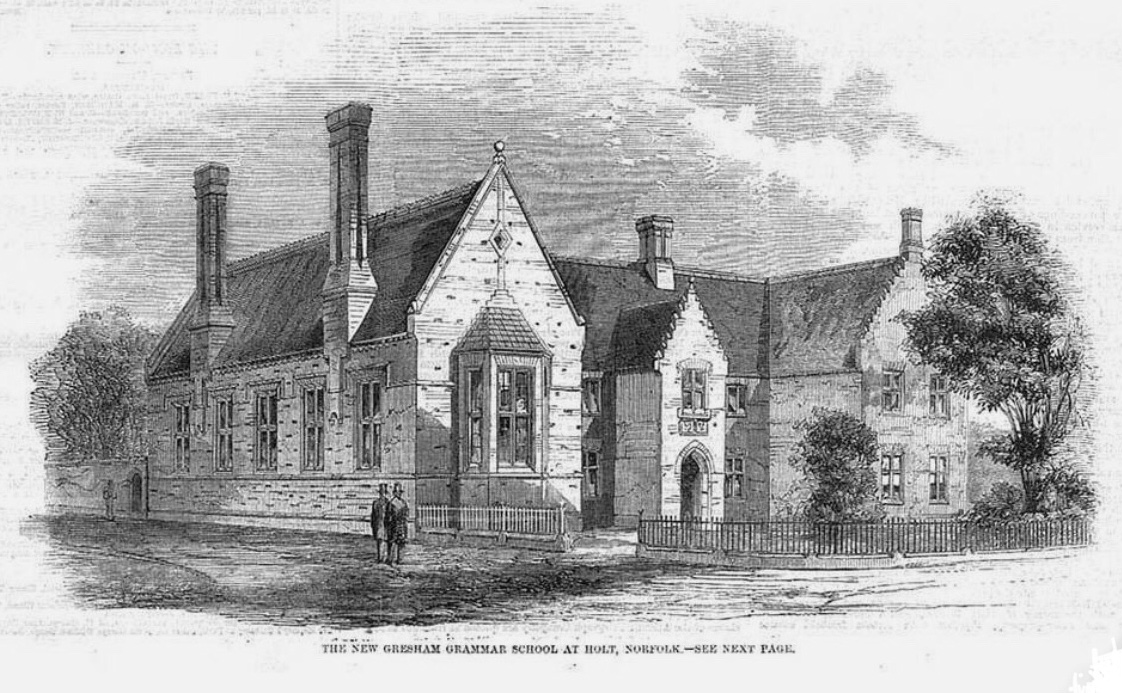
Holt School as it was on Howson's arrival

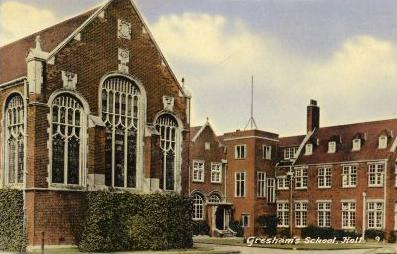
New buildings of Gresham's, 1903

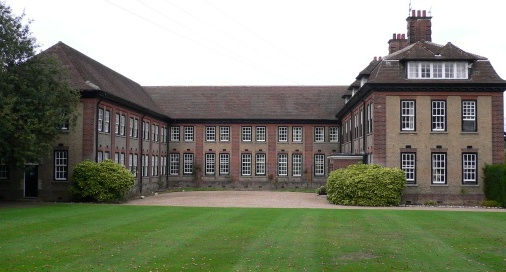
New boarding house of 1911

Howson's first position after leaving Oxford was as an assistant master at Newton College, in south Devon, from 1883 to 1886. He then moved to Uppingham School, where he remained for fourteen years, from 1886 until 1900, when he was appointed Headmaster of Gresham's School, Holt, continuing in post until his death in 1919.

When Howson arrived at Gresham's, a rather dusty ancient free grammar school founded by Sir John Gresham, he found it in numbers much as it had been when established in 1555. In 1900, the school still occupied its original Holt town centre site and contained only forty Holt Scholars, plus seven boarders. However, Howson was appointed on the clear understanding that the school was to be enlarged, and The Journal of Education reported the two matters together: "G. W. S. Howson, science master at Uppingham School, has been appointed Headmaster of Holt Grammar School, Norfolk. The Fishmongers' Company is spending £50,000 on the erection of new buildings." This is equivalent to £5,313,496 in 2025.

At Uppingham, a classical school where the cult of athletics was powerful, Howson had been a misfit, a scientist and a non-athlete. At Gresham's, he became "a bitter foe of athleticism", and under his headship there were no silver cups or athletic trophies. There were even no matches played against other schools.

During Howson's time as headmaster, a new set of school buildings was built on an edge-of-town site on the Cromer Road, transforming the school and quadrupling its population. The first such new buildings, designed by the architect Chatfeild Clarke, were opened by Field Marshal Sir Evelyn Wood on 30 September 1903. These consisted of School House (renamed Howson's in 1919, after Howson's death) and the main classrooms building, including a hall called Big School. More boarding houses were bought or built between 1905 and 1911. A new School Chapel was completed in 1916, during the Great War, during which one hundred Old Greshamians were killed.

The poet W. H. Auden wrote favourably of the new school's private studies for boys, its warm classrooms, magnificent library and excellent laboratories.

A portrait of Howson by his friend Sholto Johnstone Douglas hangs at Gresham's in Big School.

In Who's Who, Howson stated his recreations as riding, fives, and trout-fishing.

He died suddenly on 7 January 1919. His Executors were Charles James Howson and James Ronald Eccles, his successor at Gresham's. The Times said of Howson "Under him the school made rapid progress, especially in science teaching", and "He has been called away, as he would have wished, while in the faithful discharge of his duty."

J. H. Simpson later wrote of Howson's achievements at Gresham's:

He went there in 1900, when it was a little-known grammar school in a remote corner of Norfolk, and in the remaining nineteen years of his life he made it known throughout England for its bold and original methods.

A new school library was built in memory of Howson and opened by Field Marshal Lord Milne in June 1931. On 31 January 1932, a bronze bust of Howson by Kathleen Scott was unveiled in the library by Howson's successor, J. R. Eccles.

== Author ==
Howson's publications include his Sermons by a Lay Headmaster, Preached at Gresham's School, 1900-1918 (Longmans, Green and Co., 1920).

== See also ==
- John Saul Howson

== Bibliography ==
- Simpson, James Herbert, Howson of Holt: a study in school life. 93 pp. (Sidgwick & Jackson, 1925; Cambridge Occupational Analysts Ltd., new illustrated edition, 2010, ISBN 978-1-906711-09-2)
- Eccles, J. R., One Hundred Terms at Gresham's School (1934)
