= Robert Hethe =

14th-century English politician

Robert Hethe (died 1396), of Little Saxham, Suffolk, was an English member of parliament.

== Family ==
His son, Thomas Hethe, was an MP for Suffolk.

== Career ==
He was a member (MP) of the parliament of England for Ipswich in February 1383 and January 1390.
