= Gresham's School =

Private school in Holt, Norfolk, England

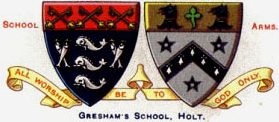

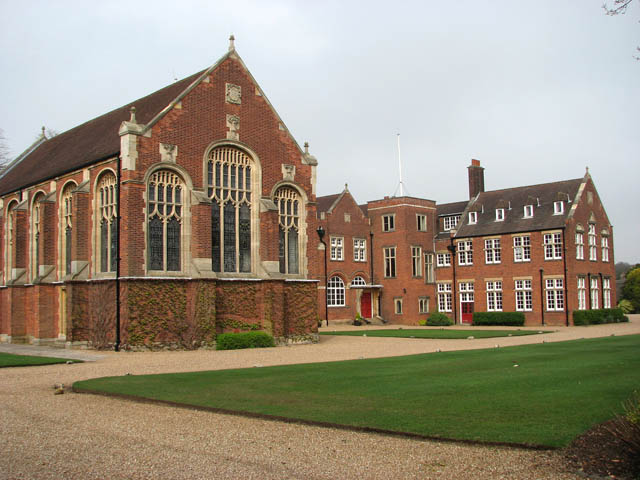

Location
- Holt, Norfolk, NR25 6EA; England; 52°54′37″N 1°06′13″E

Information
- Type: Public fee-charging boarding and day school
- Motto: Al Worship Be to God Only
- Religious affiliation: Church of England
- Established: 1555; 471 years ago
- Founder: Sir John Gresham
- Department for Education URN: 121222 Tables
- Chairman of Governors: Paul Marriage
- Headmaster: Douglas Robb
- Staff: c. 90
- Gender: Co-educational
- Age: 2 to 18
- Enrolment: c. 900
- Student to teacher ratio: 10:1
- Campus size: 200-acre (81 ha)
- Campus type: Semi-rural
- Houses: Howson's (1903); Woodlands (1905); Farfield (1911); Tallis (1963); Oakeley (1971); Edinburgh (1984); Queens (1992); Arkell (2023)
- Colours: Black, white and gold
- Budget: £23,134,000 (2024)
- Revenue: £23,542,000 (2024)
- Alumni: Old Greshamians ("OGs")
- Patron: Anne, Princess Royal
- Affiliations: Worshipful Company of Fishmongers and HMC
- Website: http://www.greshams.com/

Gresham's School is a public school (English fee-charging boarding and day school) in Holt, Norfolk, England, one of the top twenty International Baccalaureate schools in England.

The school was founded in 1555 by Sir John Gresham as a free grammar school for forty boys, following King Henry VIII's dissolution of Beeston Priory. The founder left the school's endowments in the hands of the Worshipful Company of Fishmongers of the City of London, who are still the school's trustees.

In the 1890s, an increase in the rental income of property in the City of London led to a major expansion of the school, building on land that it already owned at the eastern edge of Holt, including several new boarding houses as well as new teaching buildings, library, and chapel.

Gresham's admitted girls from 1971 and is now fully co-educational. As well as its senior school, it operates a preparatory and a nursery and pre-prep school, the latter now in the Old School House, the historic home of the school. Altogether, the three schools teach about eight hundred children.

In September 2025, Tatler shortlisted Gresham's for its Tatler Schools Awards 2026 "Best Public School" title, together with Eton, Brighton, Canford, and Caterham. In October, it was announced that Gresham's had won the title.

== History ==
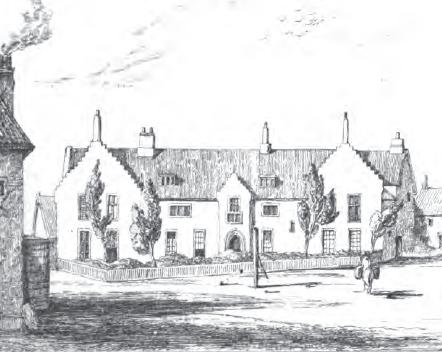
The Old School House, sketched in 1838

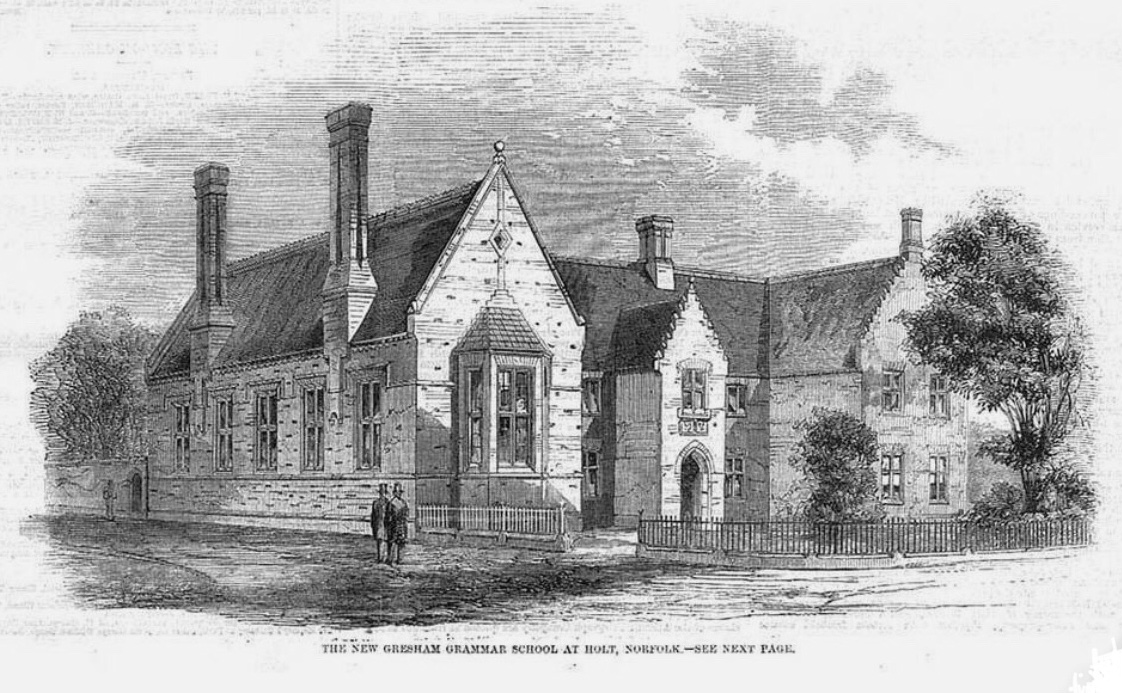
The Old School House as updated in 1859

=== The school ===
Gresham's School, Holt, was founded by Sir John Gresham, who obtained letters patent in 1555, during the reign of Queen Mary I. For its home he gave the school his manor house at Holt, which he had bought in 1546 from his elder brother Sir William Gresham.

The founding of Gresham's was connected to King Henry VIII's suppression of the Priory of Augustinian canons at Beeston Regis in June 1539. The Priory of St Mary in the Meadow, Beeston Regis, established in 1216, had operated a school which John Gresham and his brothers probably attended, but the school came to an end with the priory, leaving no provision for education in the neighbourhood of Holt.

The new school opened and was granted a Royal Charter in 1562. By the letters patent of 1555, the school was called in full 'The Free Grammar School of Sir John Gresham, knight, citizen and alderman of London'. The founder endowed Gresham's generously, placing its property in trust with the Worshipful Company of Fishmongers of the City of London, and full estate records dating from the school's foundation are held at the Guildhall Library. Sir John Gresham's endowments included his freehold property in Holt and Letheringsett, his wood and land called Prior's Grove, his manors of Pereers and Holt Hales, "with all and singular to the same belonging, situate in Holt, Sherington, Letheringsett, Bodham, Kellinge, Wayborne, Semlingham, Stodrye, Bantrye and West Wickham, in the said county of Norfolk", and also tenements called 'The White Hind' and 'The Peacock' in the parish of St Giles-without-Cripplegate, London. Close links with the Fishmongers' Company continue to the present.

By his Will of 1601, Leonard Smith, a fishmonger of London, left £120 and all his goods to establish a fellowship at Sidney Sussex College, Cambridge, and in 1604 'Mr Smith's Fellowship' was confirmed by the college, with the provision that "scholars from the Grammar School of Holt, in Norfolk" were to have preference.

The school library contains the Foundation Library, a collection of books and manuscripts provided at the school's establishment in 1555 and later.

On Christmas Day 1650, Thomas Cooper, a former usher of Gresham's, was hanged for his part in a Royalist rebellion on behalf of Charles II. His body was left hanging on a gibbet in the Holt Market Place.

For three hundred and fifty years, the school was based in what is now called the Old School House, or "OSH", the former manor house of Holt overlooking the Market Place in the town centre. In 1708, the school escaped a major fire which destroyed most of the rest of the mediaeval town of Holt. This resulted in most of the buildings now to be seen in the town centre belonging to the 18th century.

In 1729, the Fishmongers' Company presented the school with "...a valuable and useful library, not only of the best editions of the Classics and Lexicographers, but also with some books of Antiquities, Chronology, and Geography, together with a suitable pair of globes". By the 18th century, references to fish were hard to find in the court minutes of the Fishmongers' Company, and the company's main business had become managing its extensive property and administering its charities and trusts, such as the school at Holt and St Peter's Hospital, an almshouse at Newington in Surrey.

For the period 1704 to 1750, Charles Linnell analysed the 'Status of fathers of boys at Holt Grammar School' in his Gresham's School History and Register (1955): "Sons of gentlemen 10%, clergy 30%, professional men 5%, tradesmen 20%, plebeian 15%, unknown 20%".

One of the school's 18th-century heads was John Holmes, appointed at the age of twenty-seven, a prolific writer of educational textbooks, who led the school between 1730 and his death in 1760.

In the 19th century, boys were strictly required to attend services at the Holt parish church, and in November 1815 a boy called Charles Loynes was "expelled for non-attendance at church".

In 1823, the expenditure of the Fishmongers' Company on the school was £367, of which £158-10s-0d was for the master's salary, allowances and gratuities, £80 for the Usher's salary, board and lodging, £52-11s-6d for repairs, £22-12s-6d for taxes, £15-15s-6d for poor rates, £12-10s-0d for coals, £9-13s-4d for two-thirds of the cost of the school books, and £6-6s-0d for a School Feast which took place in June.

In 1836, the 'Wardens and Commonalty of the Art and Mystery of Fishmongers of the City of London' held an insurance policy for 'Other property or occupiers: Free Grammar School Holt Norfolk (Rev Benn. Pulleyn)' with the Sun Fire Office.

In his History of the Twelve Great Livery Companies of London (1836), William Herbert says of the school:

GRESHAM'S. - At Holt, in Norfolk. For fifty free scholars, chosen from the town of Holt and neighbourhood, and admitted at six and seven years old. The nomination is in the Fishmongers' Company, in whom also is left the patronage and government of the school.

Herbert also notes that the officers of the court of the Fishmongers' Company include "a steward of the Holt free school, in Norfolk". John William Burgon, in The Life and Times of Sir Thomas Gresham (1839), after listing the estates with which Sir John Gresham endowed the school, says

Had the trustees of this school been formerly distinguished for the same vigilance which characterizes their representatives at the present day, it would not have been our painful duty to state, that of the extensive demesnes with which Holt grammar-school was endowed by its founder – sufficient, had they been properly managed, to have set it on a level with the first establishments of a similar nature in England – there remains at present but 162 acres (0.66 km^{2}) of land. Its total revenue amounts to not quite 350l., about two-thirds of which arise from its estates in London.

Burgon goes on, however, to add

Notwithstanding every disadvantage, this school, liberally conducted, and regulated by salutary statutes, is in a flourishing condition at the present day, and educates fifty free-scholars; to any one of whom removing to either of the universities, an annual exhibition of 20l. is allowed... Holt school... is an ornament and a blessing to the county, and reflects much credit on the trustees and its worthy principal—the Rev. B. Pulleyne.

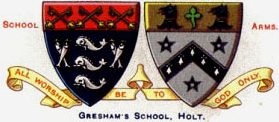
Coat of arms of the Fishmongers' Company and of John Gresham

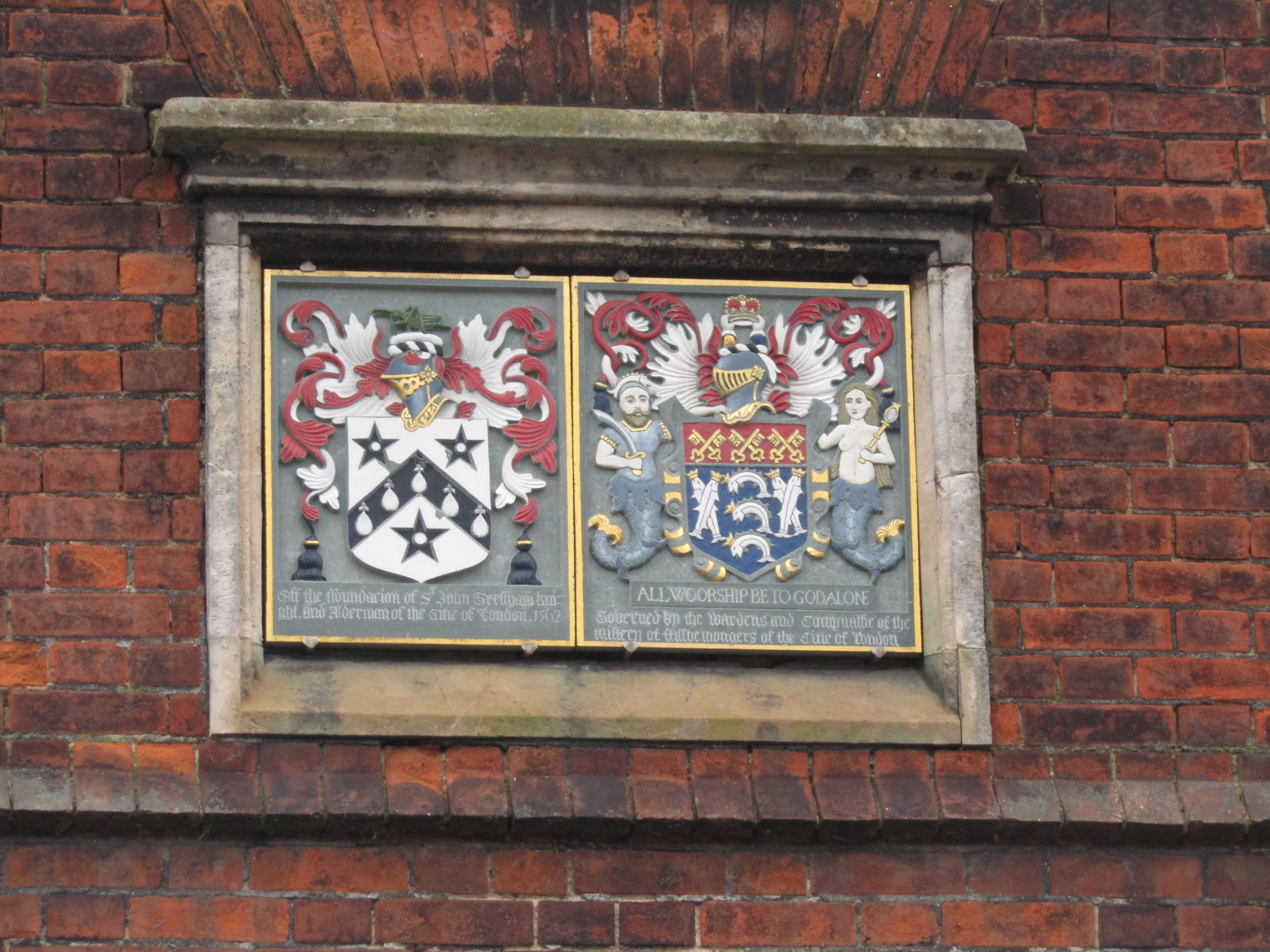
Arms of Sir John Gresham and the Fishmongers' Company over the door of the Old School House on Station Road, Holt, as rebuilt in 1859–1860

In 1859, the Gresham Grammar School was closed while its site was substantially rebuilt and converted, providing accommodation for boarders. It re-opened on 30 July 1860.

In 1880, a commission was appointed to enquire into the Livery companies of the City of London. When it published its first reports in 1881, the following formed part of a 'Supplementary Statement on behalf of the Fishmongers' Company' included in Volume 1:

In the case of Sir John Gresham's Grammar School at Holt, in Norfolk, the Company have from time to time supplemented the trust funds, especially for the purposes of rebuilding and repairs, the amount in which the trust was indebted to the Company, at a not very distant date, having been over 10,000£., and this notwithstanding the constant warnings of the Charity Commissioners that the Company were doing this at their own risk, and that they could in no case be permitted to apply any part of the capital of the trust funds in repayment of their advances; nor any part of the trust income, except within a period of 30 years.

In the early 1900s, under an ambitious headmaster called George Howson (who had moved to Gresham's from Uppingham), the school expanded onto a new campus of some 200 acres (0.81 km^{2}) at the eastern edge of the town, while keeping the Old School House as one of its houses. When Howson arrived at Gresham's, he found it in numbers much as it had been when founded in 1555: in 1900 there were only forty Holt Scholars, plus seven boarders.

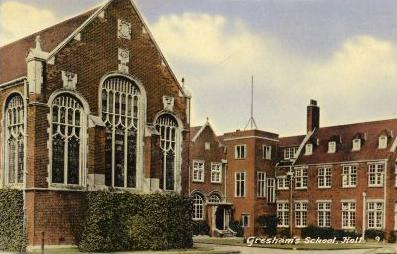
Big School, 1903, by the architect Sir John William Simpson

The New School (by the architect Sir John Simpson) was opened by Sir Evelyn Wood on 30 September 1903. This consisted of School House (renamed as Howson's in 1919) and the Main Building, including the Big School hall. Woodlands was acquired and opened as a new house in 1905, the school's first swimming pool was opened in 1907, and Farfield was built in 1911. The School Chapel was completed in 1916, during the Great War, during which one hundred and six Old Greshamians were killed.

Under Howson's successor as headmaster, J. R. Eccles, Gresham's appears to have been one of the first schools in England to abolish corporal punishment. In March 1921, Eccles wrote to The Times and "condemned corporal punishment of any kind". His letter is not, however, evidence of permanent abolition at Gresham's.

The Thatched Buildings, the gift of Eccles, were opened by Sir Arthur Shipley in February 1921.

In 1923, Sir Harry Brittain asked Edward Wood, President of the Board of Education in the House of Commons "whether he will explain why Gresham's school, Holt, was admitted to the benefits of the Superannuation Act although it is an endowed school, owning all its buildings and supported by a wealthy city company?"

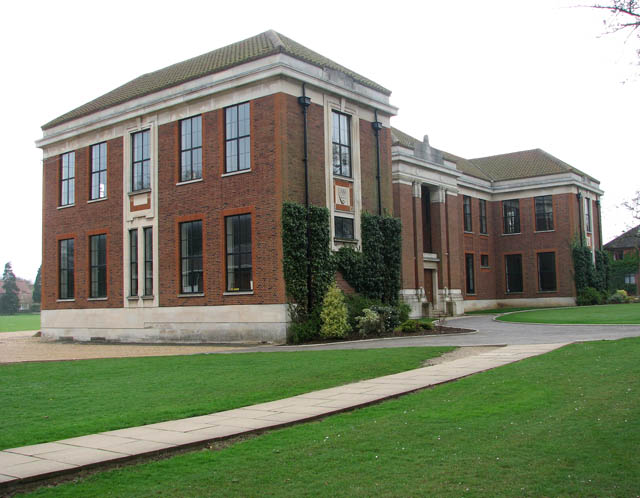
The Library (1931)

A new school library, designed by the architect Alan E. Munby, was opened in 1931 by Field Marshal Lord Milne.

In the 1930s, there were three categories of scholarship in the senior school: Holt A scholarships gave complete exemption from fees, County Scholarships were worth £100 a year, and Fishmongers' Company Open Scholarships were worth £50 a year.

In June 1940, soon after the end of the "Phoney War" stage of the Second World War, the school was evacuated to Newquay in Cornwall. Winston Churchill visited its Holt campus in August 1940. In December 1944, Gresham's packed its belongings for the return to Holt and re-opened there in January 1945.

Martin Burgess's memories of Gresham's during the freezing months of January to March 1947, the coldest British winter on record, are quoted at length in I Will Plant Me a Tree (2002). Not only was the winter icy cold, but because of fuel shortages, the school was unheated. Burgess recalls that "Periods were held in full overcoats and scarves and gloves. If it happened now the School would be closed, but such a step was not even thought of then. In any case, the roads were blocked... One day the School was called out to dig out a farm, or was it a small village? Hurrah! No periods! In the afternoon everyone prayed there would be periods, it was so cold. A man had died."

Under the long headship of Logie Bruce Lockhart (1955–1982), there was a further period of change and expansion. Kenwyn, a new Junior School House, was built and opened in 1958. The bridge over Cromer Road was opened in 1962 and was initiated after the death of Kirsty, LBL's daughter, while crossing Cromer Road in front of Howson's. Tallis, a new boys' house named after John Tallis, Master of the school for more than thirty years in the first half of the seventeenth century, was built and opened in 1963, as were the biology classrooms and music rooms. Oakeley became the first girls' house in 1971 when girls were first admitted to the Sixth Form only. The school became fully co-educational in the 1970s.

There are now four boarding houses for boys and three for girls (see "Houses" section below), as well as a wide range of buildings. These include Big School, the School Chapel, the Auden Theatre, the Cairns Centre, the School Library, the Music Centre, the Central Block, the Thatched Classrooms, the Reith Laboratories, the Biology Building, the Armoury and others.

In February 2005, Gresham's School's 450th anniversary was marked by a service at Norwich Cathedral attended by the school's Patron, Prince Philip, Duke of Edinburgh, and 1,500 past and present Greshamians. In July 2005, the Eastern Daily Press called it "a school which changed the world".

When Philip John, formerly head of King William's College, arrived to take over the headmastership in September 2008, the Tatler Schools Guide commented "It will be interesting to observe the impact of mathematician Philip John." He left in 2013; and Nigel Flower, the deputy head, took over as acting head. Douglas Robb, previously head of Oswestry School, took up the position of headmaster in September 2014.

In 2021, a new STEAM education building was completed, the gift of Sir James Dyson, an old boy of the school.

=== Headmasters ===
See List of masters of Gresham's School.

== Notable former pupils ==
See List of Old Greshamians and Category:People educated at Gresham's School.

Old Greshamian groups include the Old Greshamian Society, open to all former pupils, which publishes a magazine and has some four thousand members; the OG Golf Society, the OG Cricket Team, the OG Rifle Establishment (OGRE), which has its own residence at Bisley, and the OG Masonic Lodge, which was formed in January 1939.

Notable Old Greshamians include the poet W. H. Auden, the composers Benjamin Britten, and Lennox Berkeley, Stephen Spender, James Dyson, rugby players Tom Youngs and Ben Youngs, the fourth President of Ireland Erskine Hamilton Childers, the KGB spy Donald Maclean, Sir Alan Hodgkin, Lord Reith, Olivia Colman and mass murderer Jeremy Bamber who carried out the White House Farm murders following bullying at Gresham's School.

== Houses ==
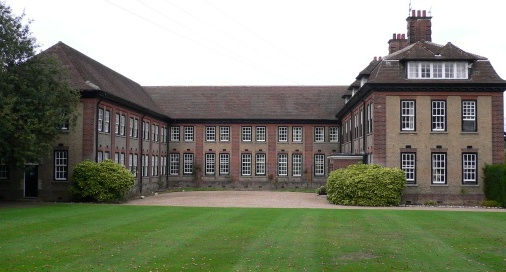
Farfield

Most Gresham's students are boarders and live in one of the school's seven boarding houses. Four of these are for boys: Howson's (1903), Woodlands (1905), Farfield (1911), and Tallis (1961). Three houses are for girls: Oakeley (1971), Edinburgh (1987), and Queens' (1992), known as Britten until 2016.

Edinburgh, designed by Nicholas Hare Architects, was opened by Prince Philip, Duke of Edinburgh, the school's Patron, after whom it is named.

Britten, the school's third house for girls, was opened in 1992 and named after the composer Benjamin Britten. It is an extension of the former school Sanatorium, designed by William Henry Ansell. While at the school Britten was often sick and did much of his early composition in the Sanatorium, including his A Hymn to the Virgin. The name of Britten was changed to Queens' House in September 2016, in honour of Queen Mary I, Queen Elizabeth I and Queen Elizabeth II. During each of their reigns, the school developed.

Each house has a housemaster or housemistress and a house tutor and matron. There are house teams for team sports, as well as other house activities, such as evening prayers, "prep", and dramatic productions. Most houses have about seventy members.

Senior boys and girls may be appointed as house prefects. Some of those are then chosen as school prefects and one in each house as House Captain.

A new house, Arkell, for day boys and girls in the sixth form, opened in September 2023, named after John Hardy Arkell, a former headmaster.

The Old School House was previously the main school building, then from 1905 to 1936 was the Junior House. From 1936 to 1993 it was a boarding house of the senior school and since then has been the home of the Gresham's pre-preparatory school.

== Junior Schools ==
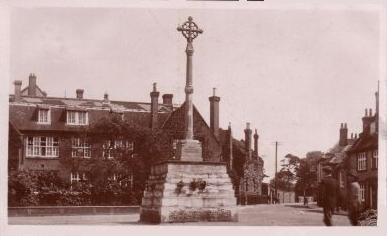
The Old School House and new war memorial, 1921

The former Junior School of Gresham's was reorganised into a Preparatory School and a Pre-Preparatory School in 1984, both on their own sites at Holt, with their own heads and staff. Like the Senior School, both are fully co-educational.

The Prep school has over two hundred children between the ages of seven and thirteen and takes full and weekly boarders as well as day pupils. Many continue into the Senior School. The school's Kenwyn House was once a house of the Senior School called Bengal Lodge.

The Pre-Preparatory School is housed in the Old School House and is a day school for approximately one hundred boys and girls between the ages of two and seven.

== Curriculum ==
The school teaches most subjects of the mainstream humanistic curriculum. While only limited choices between courses need to be made for GCSE, in the sixth form at A-level pupils choose three or four subjects, and most combinations are possible.

- Latin and Greek
- Modern languages: French, German, Spanish, Italian, and Japanese
- English Literature
- Mathematics
- physics, chemistry, biology
- computer science, art and design, history of art
- history, geography, politics, economics, business studies
- religious studies and philosophy, psychology
- theatre studies, music, physical education

Since February 2007 the school has been an International Baccalaureate World School (IB code 003433), offering the IB Diploma Programme.

== School terms ==
The school's year is divided into three terms, Michaelmas (early September to mid-December), Lent (early January to the Easter holiday) and Summer (Easter holiday to mid-July). In the middle of each term there is a half-term holiday, usually a week long. For boarders, there are also other home weekends.

The academic year begins with the Michaelmas term and ends with the summer term, so starts at the end of the summer vacation.

== School sports ==
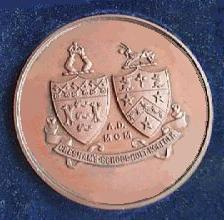
Gresham's School bronze medal for sports, dated 1900

Apart from its sports grounds for cricket, rugby, hockey, and soccer, the school has its own indoor swimming pool, squash, tennis, and badminton courts, gymnasium, sports hall, music school (the Britten Building), and extensive school woods with an outdoor activity centre. It owns a boat-house at Barton Broad and a shooting lodge at Bisley, as well as a shooting range at the school.

The principal school sports for boys are rugby (Michaelmas Term), hockey (Lent Term) and cricket, tennis and athletics (summer term) and for girls hockey (Michaelmas Term), netball (Lent Term), and cricket, tennis, and athletics (summer term). There is a wide range of other school sports, including badminton, football, squash, golf, martial arts, swimming, sailing, cross country running, shooting, and canoeing.

An Old Greshamian, Richard Leman, was a member of the gold medal-winning British hockey squad at the 1988 Summer Olympics and of the bronze medal-winning team at the 1984 Summer Olympics. Another OG, Gawain Briars, was the British number one squash player and went on to head the world Professional Squash Association. Brother and sister Ralph and Natasha Firman are racing drivers, and Natasha was the winner of the inaugural Formula Woman championship in 2004. Giles Baring and Andrew Corran were first-class cricketers, while international rugby footballers include Andy Mulligan (Ireland) and the British and Irish Lions, Nick Youngs (England and his sons Ben and Tom (England). Both also played for the British and Irish Lions winning team in Australia in 2013. In rifle-shooting, Gresham's has been one of the top ten schools in England since about 1955, and Glyn Barnett won a shooting gold medal in the 2006 Commonwealth Games at Melbourne. In the field of winter sports, the 11th Earl of Northesk took an Olympic medal for tobogganing (then called 'skeleton') in 1928. Notable mountaineers have included Tom Bourdillon, Percy Wyn-Harris, Peter Lloyd, and Matt Dickinson.

== Chapel ==
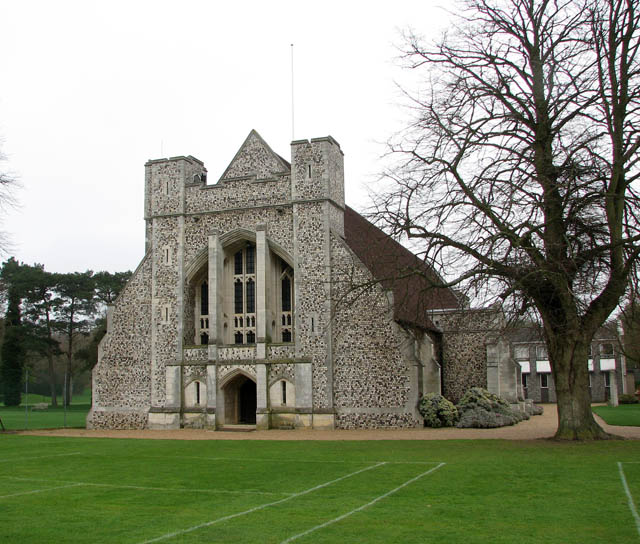
The School Chapel

Gresham's is a Church of England foundation and was recognized as such by the Designation of Schools Having a Religious Character (Independent Schools) (England) Order 2004, but it is open to all denominations and religions. Services are a focal point of the school's life, with a morning assembly in chapel on four mornings of the week. Pupils not in the sixth form have an extra morning in chapel, while sixth formers have another tutorial period. The Saturday morning service is a choral practice, and Holy Communion may be taken on Sundays. There are also formal prayers in most boarding houses in the evenings.

Non-Anglicans are excused communion services on Sundays, and Roman Catholics attend mass on Sunday at the church of Our Lady and St Joseph in Sheringham.

Boys and girls who so wish are prepared at the school for confirmation into the Church of England, usually conducted by the Bishop of Norwich or one of his suffragan Bishops.

The foundation stone of the chapel was laid by the chairman of governors Sir Edward Busk on 8 June 1912. However, there had been little progress by October 1913, when the plans by the architects Sir J. W. Simpson and Maxwell Ayrton were for a two-storey building seating about 600, with a high bell tower. In the event, a smaller chapel was built between 1914 and 1916 and is now a listed building. The Chapel bell, cast in Whitechapel in 1915, is inscribed with the words Ring in the Christ that is to be, Donum Dedit J. R. E.. The last words stand for "the gift of J. R. Eccles", who at the time was second master, later headmaster, while the first eight are the last line of Alfred, Lord Tennyson's poem Ring Out, Wild Bells (1850). The Gresham family motto, Fiat voluntas tua ('Thy will be done') appears on the chapel's main door.

The tune called Woodlands, the setting for the hymns Lift Up Your Hearts! and Tell Out My Soul, Timothy Dudley-Smith's versification of the Magnificat, was composed for the school in 1916 by Walter Greatorex, a Gresham's master, who succeeded another composer, Geoffrey Shaw, as the school's Director of Music.

Old Greshamians include several bishops, David Hand, Archbishop of Papua New Guinea, and John Bradburne, a candidate for canonisation.

== Out of school activities ==
Love's Labour's Lost enacted at Gresham's, c. 1914

There is a school orchestra, a school choir, a Duke of Edinburgh's Award Scheme and a number of school clubs.

North Norfolk Divers, a branch of the British Sub-Aqua Club, is based at the school.

A school play is produced at the end of every Summer Term, and each house also puts on a performance through House Entertains once a year.

In 1922, W. H. Auden played the Shrew in The Taming of the Shrew and in 1925 he played Caliban in The Tempest.

== Combined Cadet Force ==
Gresham's has a long military tradition, from Sir Christopher Heydon, who took part in the capture of Cádiz in 1596, to Tom Wintringham, commander of the British Battalion of the International Brigades in the Spanish Civil War, and General Sir Robert Bray, Deputy Supreme Allied Commander Europe.

Before the Second World War, the school had an Officers Training Corps. During the 1940s, OTCs in British schools were renamed 'Junior Training Corps', and the school's JTC was amalgamated into the Combined Cadet Force in April 1948, which continues to provide military training.

The CCF's Army section is now associated with the 1st Battalion of the Royal Anglian Regiment (previously with the Royal Norfolk Regiment, to 1959, and the 1st East Anglian Regiment, 1959 to 1964) and has some 270 pupils as cadets. About another 130 are in the CCF's Air section, and training takes place on Friday afternoon of each week. Activities include shooting, expeditions, combat manoeuvres, ambush and continuity drills, signals training, orienteering, climbing, kayaking, line-laying, first aid and lifesaving, motor mechanics and hovercraft construction.

A Biennial Review of the Gresham's School CCF Contingent was carried out on 10 May 2006 by General Sir Richard Dannatt KCB CBE MC, Commander-in-Chief Land Command and Chief of the General Staff designate.

== Fees ==
The school's annual fees for the academic year 2022–23 are:

- Senior School boarders: £39,345
- Senior School Day Place Non-Boarders in a boarding house: £27,450
- Senior School Day Place in Arkell House: £20,490
- Preparatory School boarders: £28,500
- Preparatory School non-boarders: £16,515–20,355
- Pre-preparatory School Year 2: £12,120
- Pre-preparatory School Year 1: £11,295
- Pre-preparatory School Reception: £11,295

In September 2005, Gresham's was one of fifty British schools which were considered by the Office of Fair Trading to be operating a fee-fixing cartel in breach of the Competition Act 1998. All of the schools were ordered to abandon the practice of exchanging information on their planned fees.

Combined scholarships of up to 40 per cent of fees are available.

== Governing body ==
More than half of the school's governing body represent the Worshipful Company of Fishmongers, who have been the school's trustees since 1555. The chairman of governors (currently Paul Marriage) was until recently always a past or present prime warden of the Fishmongers' Company. A previous chairman was David Cairns, 5th Earl Cairns, after whom the school's Cairns Centre is named. Another prime warden, Sir Richard Carew Pole, was also a governor.

The governing body includes a representative of the University of Cambridge (this is currently Pauline Perry, Baroness Perry of Southwark) and one of Norfolk County Council, and it also seeks to include some distinguished Old Greshamians.

The clerk of the Fishmongers' Company also acts as clerk to the governing body, and its meetings are held at Fishmongers' Hall in the City of London.

== The Grasshopper ==
The Gresham grasshopper

The Grasshopper is used as the badge of several Gresham's School clubs, and a long-established school periodical is called The Grasshopper. The green insect appears as the crest above the school's coat of arms, commemorating the Founder, Sir John Gresham, whose family crest it was. The Gresham Grasshopper is also used by Gresham College and can be seen as the weathervane on the Royal Exchange in the City of London, founded in 1565 by Gresham's nephew Sir Thomas Gresham, and the similar weathervane on the Faneuil Hall in Boston, Massachusetts, which is modelled on that of the Royal Exchange. The first Royal Exchange was profusely decorated with grasshoppers.

According to an ancient legend of the Greshams, the founder of the family, Roger de Gresham, was a foundling abandoned as a new-born baby in long grass in North Norfolk in the 13th century and found there by a woman whose attention was drawn to the child by a grasshopper. Although this is a beautiful story, it is more likely that the grasshopper is simply an heraldic rebus on the name 'Gresham', with gres being a Middle English form of grass (Old English grœs).

In the system of English heraldry, the grasshopper is said to represent wisdom and nobility.

== Bibliography ==
- Holmes, John, A New Grammar of the Latin Tongue... freed from the many obscurities, defects, superfluities and errors, which render the common grammar an insufferable impediment to the progress of education, by (1732, thirteenth edition 1788)
- Holmes, John, History of England, Performed by the Gentlemen of the Grammar School... at their Christmas breaking up (drama, published in Latin and English, 1737)
- Holmes, John, The Art of Rhetorick made easy... to meet the needs of the time when schoolboys are expected to be led, sooth'd and entic'd to their studies … rather than by force and harsh discipline drove, as in days of yore (1738)
- The Mirror of Literature, Amusement and Instruction, 27 August 1825
- Crockford's Scholastic Directory, 1861 (has article on Gresham's School)
- The Free Grammar School at Holt, Norfolk in Report on the Charities of the Fishmongers' Company: Part I (City of London Livery Companies Commission Report, Volume 4, 1884) pp. 223–249
- Radford, Rev. L. B., History of Holt: a brief study of parish, church and school (Rounce & Wortley, 1908, BL 10358.f.38)
- Howson, George William Saul, Sermons by a Lay Headmaster, Preached at Gresham's School, 1900–1918 (Longmans, Green and Co, 1920)
- Partridge, H. W., Register of Gresham's School, 1900–20 (Holt, 1920)
- Gresham's School, Holt: Meeting New Demands of Life in The Times, August 6, 1920
- Simpson, James Herbert, Howson of Holt: A study in school life (Sidgwick & Jackson, 1925, 93 pp)
- Taylor, C. K., 'Where Boys and Masters Pull Together: The Sixth and Final Article on the Schools of England', in Smith, Alfred Emanuel, New Outlook (Outlook Publishing Company, Inc., 1927), pp. 112–115
- Auden, W. H., 'Gresham's School', in Greene, Graham (ed.), The Old School: Essays by Divers Hands (London: Jonathan Cape, 1934)
- Eccles, J. R., One Hundred Terms at Gresham's School (1934)
- Eccles, J. R., My Life as a Public School Master (1948)
- James Herbert Simpson, Schoolmaster's Harvest: some findings of fifty years, 1894–1944, (London, Faber and Faber, 1954)
- Charles Lawrence Scruton Lidell and A. B. Douglas, The History and Register of Gresham's School, 1555–1954 (Ipswich, 1955)
- Warin Foster Bushell, School Memories (London: Philip & Son, 1962)
- Peter John Lee, A Catalogue of the Foundation Library of Gresham's School (Holt, 1965)
- Three Centuries at Holt (Holt Society, 1968)
- Logie Bruce-Lockhart (1 March 1996). Stuff and Nonsense: Observations of a Norfolk Scot. Larks Press. ISBN 978-0-948400-40-7.
- Philip S. Newell and Bernard Sankey, Gresham's in Wartime (1988)
- Sue Smart (4 July 2001). When Heroes Die: A Forgotten Archive Reveals the Last Days of the Schoolfriends Who Died for Britain. Breedon. ISBN 978-1-85983-256-1.

== Archives ==
The Manuscripts Section of the Guildhall Library in the City of London holds the following Gresham's School records:

- Estates records 1547–1904
- Administrative records 1633–1901
- Admissions Register 1729–1857
- Prize List 1846–1891

Norfolk Record Office also holds some Gresham's accessions, including a bundle of correspondence relating to the school from 1799 to 1810 between the Fishmongers' Company and Adey & Repton, including copies of statutes.

== See also ==
- Farfield
- List of Masters of Gresham's School
- List of Old Greshamians
- Category:People educated at Gresham's School
