= Martin Burgess =

British clockmaker (1931–2022)

Edward Martin Burgess FSA FBHI (21 November 1931 – 21 February 2022), known as Martin Burgess, was an English horologist and master clockmaker.

== Early life ==
Born in Yorkshire, Burgess was educated at Gresham's School, Holt, between 1944 and 1949, where he was a member of Farfield. His exact contemporaries at Farfield included Robert Aagaard, later a furniture maker and conservator who founded the youth movement Cathedral Camps.

Burgess's memories of Gresham's during the freezing months of January to March 1947, the coldest British winter on record, are quoted at length in I Will Plant Me a Tree: an Illustrated History of Gresham's School (2002). Not only was the winter icy cold, but because of fuel-shortages the school was unheated. Burgess recalls that "Periods were held in full overcoats and scarves and gloves. If it happened now the School would be closed, but such a step was not even thought of then. In any case, the roads were blocked... One day the School was called out to dig out a farm, or was it a small village? Hurrah! No periods! In the afternoon everyone prayed there would be periods, it was so cold. A man had died."

== Career ==
After a first career as a restorer of Egyptian antiquities, Burgess turned to horology and clock-making and specialised in building innovative and gigantic clocks, often with a variety of unusual escapements.

Burgess was also a leading expert on John Harrison, the 18th-century horologist who built the first ever successful marine timekeeper (the forerunner of the marine chronometer) leading to the possibility of an accurate measurement of longitude.

Burgess coined the term sculptural horology in the 1960s.

=== Notable clocks ===
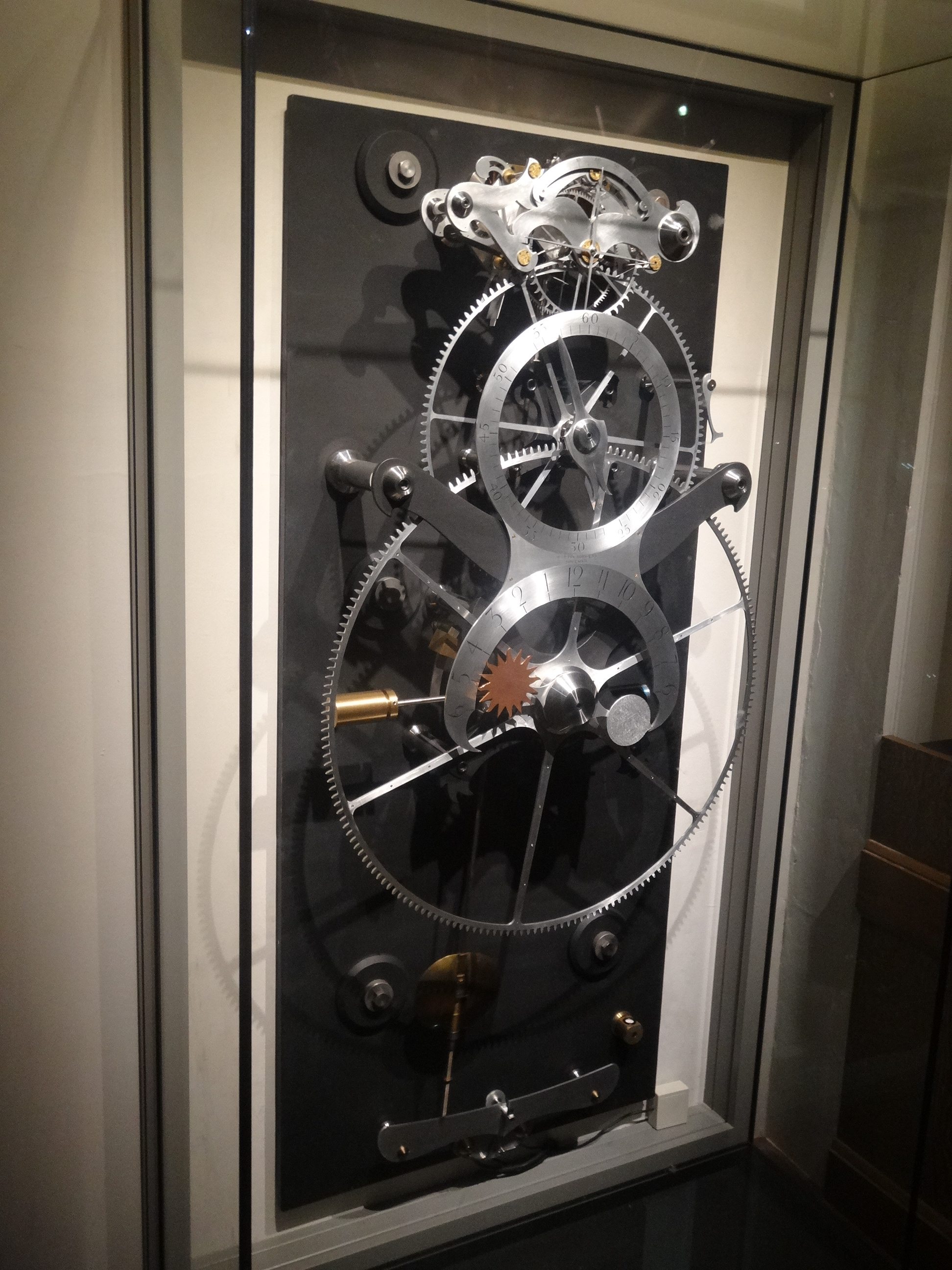
Clock B at the Royal Observatory, Greenwich.

Burgess's First Sculptural Clock with Bells, from 1963, has the dimensions 8 ft (2.4 m) high, 54 1/2 in (1,380 mm) wide, and 18 1/2 in (470 mm) deep. It is generally known as the Broxbourne Clock, after the house in Hertfordshire for which it was made. It was exhibited in the Former Time Museum of Rockford, Illinois, but is now in a private collection.

His magnificent Second Sculptural Clock, made in 1965, is now owned by the American graphic artist Donald Saff. The clock (which appeared on the cover of the Horological Journal for August 2001) has a massive compound pendulum which beats at 2.5 seconds and an escape wheel which turns in five minutes. A limited edition of thirty-five half-size replicas, known as ‘'Concord clocks'’, Harrison style with grasshopper escapement and compound pendulum, was made by E. Dent and has the dimensions 30 in (760 mm) high, 14 in (360 mm) wide, 11 in (280 mm) deep.

Burgess's Third Sculptural Clock, generally known as the Hares and Tortoises clock, was the most ambitious to date, and was his first speculative venture. It draws influences from Jost Bürgi, Edmund Beckett, 1st Baron Grimthorpe, and John Harrison. It is 35 inches (880 mm) tall and 37 in (950 mm) wide. The wheels are in Duralumin, while the frame is iron. It runs with minimal lubricants. Visually, the clock is dominated by three large wheels, which are pierced out to represent aspects of time, the left hand wheel (used for hour striking) having its crossing in the form of hares and tortoises, to echo Aesop's fable . The escapement embodies Burgess's improved version of a Grimthorpe gravity escapement. The clock has ting-tang quarter striking and hour striking. It is now in a private collection.

The Schroder clock was commissioned by the merchant bank Schroder Wagg in 1969, for a new building at 120 Cheapside. It was designed to cover a large part of a wall in the entrance lobby. Its principal feature is a duralumin wheel of 10 feet (3 metres) in diameter, which rotates once in 24 hours, showing world time. The clock was recognised in the Guinness World Records as having the largest clock wheel in existence. The clock uses a gravity escapement similar to that employed by Frank Hope-Jones, providing an impulse each minute to an 80 kg pendulum. The clock was later moved and is now displayed at Citigroup Centre, London.

His Gurney Clock was given to the people of Norwich by Barclays Bank to mark the 200th anniversary of the founding of what is now Barclays by the Gurney family in Norwich in 1775, which was also the anniversary (significant for Burgess) of the publication of John Harrison's 'A Description Concerning such Mechanism...'. The clock is in the shape of a golden lion automaton in a golden castle (the lion and castle are two of the heraldic symbols of Norwich) and has a weight-driven precision clock movement based closely on one designed in the 1740s by John Harrison. On the hour, bronze balls are taken by the lion and travel down a track to a set of scales (a symbol of Barclay's Bank) and on into the castle. The clock took eleven years to build and was housed in a public park, but by 1992 it had been badly vandalised. After a long campaign by the Norwich Society, it was then restored and installed in the Castle Mall, Norwich, inside a massive glass and metal case. It was removed from the Mall in 2015 and placed in storage.

A second, nearly identical clock movement, Clock B, was built to test John Harrison's claim that his clock designs were capable of maintaining time to within 1 second over 100 days. This was an improvement on the state of the art for land-based clocks almost as dramatic as his seagoing designs. Indeed, it was only reached at the beginning of the 20th century with evacuated pendulum clocks such as the Riefler and Shortt.

Clock B lay incomplete in Burgess's workshop until 2009, when Donald Saff acquired the unfinished movement and arranged for it to be completed (with much input from Burgess) by Charles Frodsham and Company.

In March 2014, the clock was moved to the Royal Observatory, Greenwich for testing and further adjustments were made during 2014. Finally, in a 100-day test between 6 January and 16 April 2015, it lost 5/8 of a second to claim the title of the most accurate mechanical clock with a pendulum swinging in free air.

== Death ==
Burgess died on 21 February 2022, at the age of 90.

== Publications ==
- The Mail-maker's Technique in The Antiquaries Journal Vol 33 (1953) 48–55
- Further Research into the Construction of Mail Garments in The Antiquaries Journal Vol 33 (1953) 193–202
- The Mail Shirt From Sinigaglia in The Antiquaries Journal Vol 37 (1957) 199–205
- A Mail Shirt From The Hearst Collection in The Antiquaries Journal
- A Habergeon of Westwale by William Reid and E. Martin Burgess in The Antiquaries Journal
- The Grasshopper Escapement, its Geometry and its Properties in Antiquarian Horology, Volume 7, part 5 (1970)
- Principles and Objectives, in Conservation of Clocks and Watches (ed. Peter B. Wills, British Horological Institute)
- How Greenwich Observatory Lost the Harrison Regulators (in Horological Journal, November 1974)
- The Harrison Regulator for the Gurney Clock (in Horological Journal, July 1987)
- Looking forward to the Harrison Seminar (in Horological Journal, July 1988)
- Reply to Mr Greene from Martin Burgess (in Horological Journal, April 1990)
- Questioning Airy (in Horological Journal, July 1990)
- Harrison & H4 (in Horological Journal, November 1993)
- Quest for Longitude (in Horological Journal, April 1997)

== Honours ==
- Fellow of the Society of Antiquaries
- Fellow of the British Horological Institute

== Documentary film ==
The documentary Clock-maker (1971), directed and produced by Richard Gayer, is a profile of Burgess. It focuses on the building of one of his gigantic clocks, an open mechanism eighteen feet high, driven by weights and weighing some 350 kilograms, or 760 pounds avoirdupois.
