= William Hamilton Shortt =

British horologist and engineer

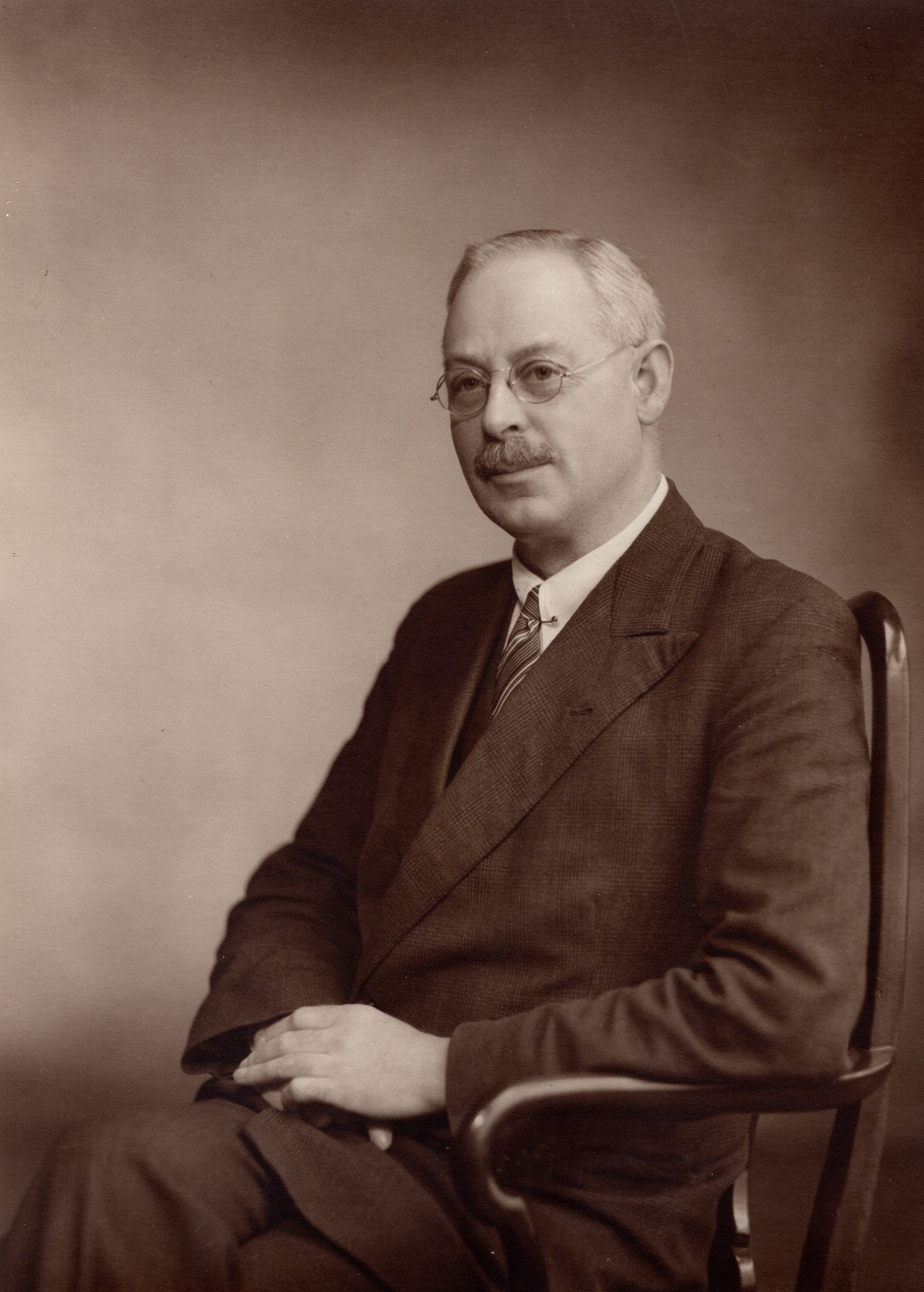
- Portrait of William Hamilton Shortt
- Born: 28 September 1881; Wimbledon, Surrey, England
- Died: 4 February 1971 (aged 89); Exeter, England
- Education: King's College London
- Known for: Shortt–Synchronome clock
- Awards: British Horological Institute Gold Medal, John Price Wetherill Medal, Worshipful Company of Clockmakers Tompion Medal
- Scientific career
- Fields: Horology
- Workplaces: Southern Railway (UK), the Synchronome Company Limited

William Hamilton Shortt (1881–1971) was a railway engineer and noted horologist, responsible for the design of the Shortt-Synchronome free pendulum clock, a widely used time standard, employed internationally in observatories in the period between the two World Wars. His deep involvement in precision timekeeping, as a colleague of Frank Hope-Jones and director of the Synchronome Company, derived from work on the safety of train travel and the accurate measurement of train speeds, following investigations into a serious train derailment of a LSWR train at Salisbury Station in 1906, when twenty-eight people died.

Shortt was born in September 1881 in Wimbledon, Surrey, only son of Charles Henry Shortt, a civil engineer, and Fanny (née Dobson) who was sister to the poet Henry Austin Dobson. He worked at the LSWR from 1902, starting as an articled pupil. He became an associate of the Institution of Civil Engineers in 1907. Shortt met Hope-Jones in 1910, and began collaborating in the design of master clocks from 1912, joining the Synchronome Company as a shareholder and director. He produced a series of designs involving new forms of escapement, attempting to optimise the delivery of energy to the pendulum, while taking account of variations in external factors such as temperature and atmospheric pressure. Shortt's experiments continued until 1916, when he was released from duties with the LSWR to serve as a captain in the Royal Engineers in France.

In 1919, having been demobilised from the army, he returned to his experimental work, producing a series of clocks in which he continued to try new ways of delivering an impulse to the pendulum, while attempting to make the pendulum do as little work as possible. The theoretical ideal was a pendulum operating freely in a vacuum and doing no work. Some of the best performances to date had been achieved by clocks housed in vacuum tanks, using a Riefler escapement.

Shortt's breakthrough in 1920 came with the development of a clock system, inspired by the work of R.J. Rudd of Croydon, championed by Hope-Jones, in which the task (each thirty seconds) of unlocking the impulse to an otherwise free pendulum was taken on by a separate slave clock, which in turn was corrected (as part of the same operating cycle) by a synchronising pulse derived from the master clock, containing the free pendulum. This system therefore utilised a mechanical phase-locked loop. Championed by the Astronomer Royal of Scotland, Ralph Allan Sampson, Shortt's free pendulum clock was rapidly adopted worldwide by many observatories as a time standard, and remained as such until the widespread adoption of quartz clocks from the Second World War onwards.

Shortt was honoured for his work in horology and precision timekeeping with the Gold Medal from the British Horological Institute in 1931 and its Fellowship in 1932, the John Price Wetherill Medal from the Franklin Institute in 1935, and the Tompion Medal of the Worshipful Company of Clockmakers in 1954. He was made a liveryman of the Company in 1931 and served as Master in 1950.

== Extra reading ==
- Frank Hope-Jones, Electrical Timekeeping (NAG: London, 1940)
- R.H. Miles, Synchronome – Masters of Electrical Timekeeping (AHS: London, 2019), pp. 27–30, chapters 8 and 9.
