= Sigmund Riefler =

German physicist

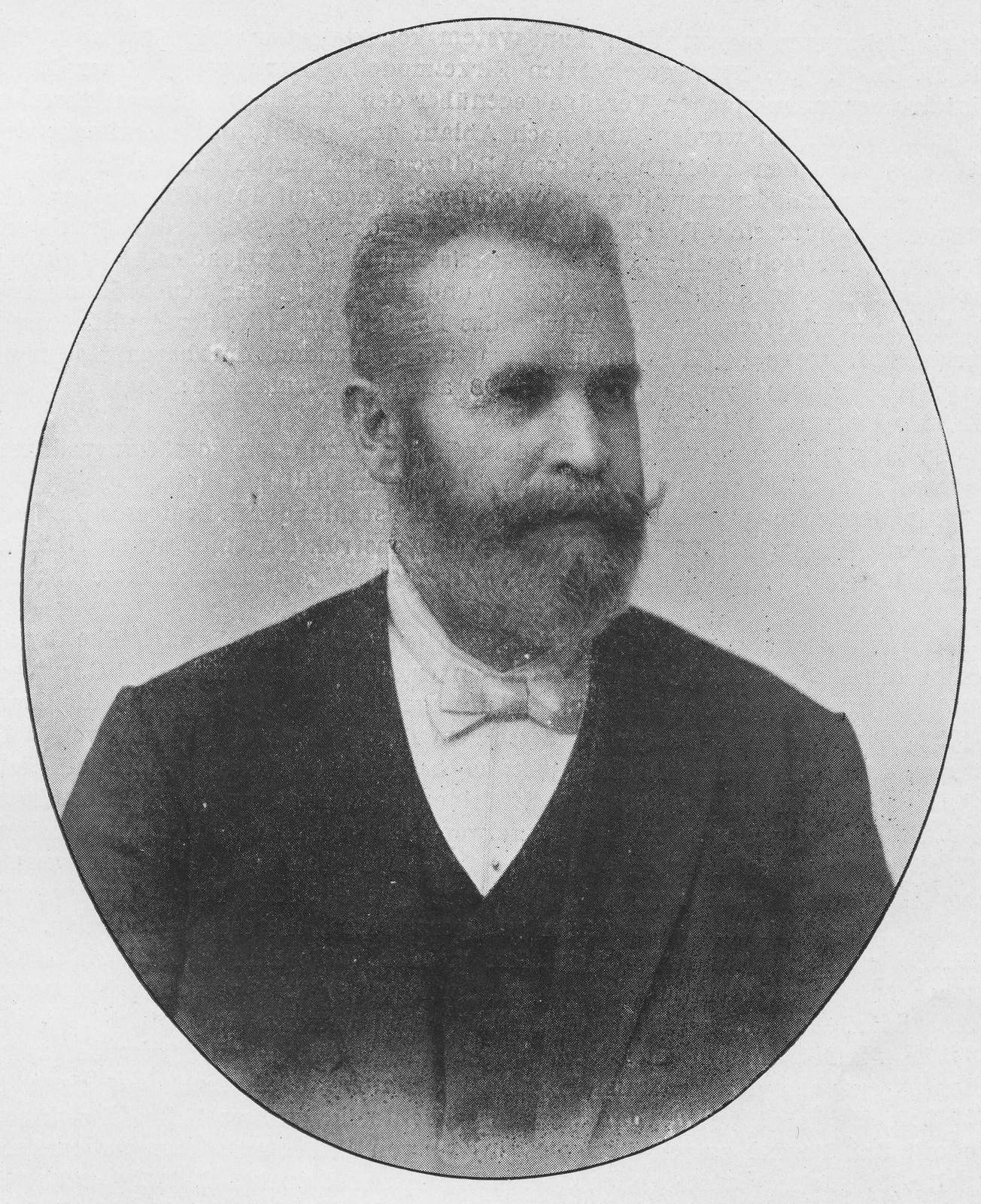
- Born: 9 August 1847; Maria Rain
- Died: 21 October 1912 (aged 65); Munich
- Education: Ludwig-Maximilians-Universität München
- Known for: Riefler escapement
- Scientific career
- Fields: Horology

Sigmund Riefler (9 August 1847 – 21 October 1912) was a German physicist, inventor and precision clockmaker.

== Life ==
Sigmund Riefler was born on 9 August 1847 to Magdalena and Clemens Riefler in Maria Rain (Oy-Mittelberg). He studied mathematics, geodesy and mechanical engineering at the Technical University of Munich, and then physics and astronomy at the Ludwig-Maximilians-Universität München. From 1870, he worked as an engineer in the Royal Prussian Land Survey, surveying land in Schleswig.

In 1876 after the death of his father, he took over the firm of Clemens Riefler with his two brothers, Adolf and Theodor. Sigmund worked mainly on new developments in the area of drawing instruments and precision clocks, while his brothers handled the technical, sales and management of the company.

In 1878, he settled in Munich, to be in contact with the local scientific community. He invented the Riefler escapement which was patented in 1889. He died in Munich on 21 October 1912 at the age of 65.

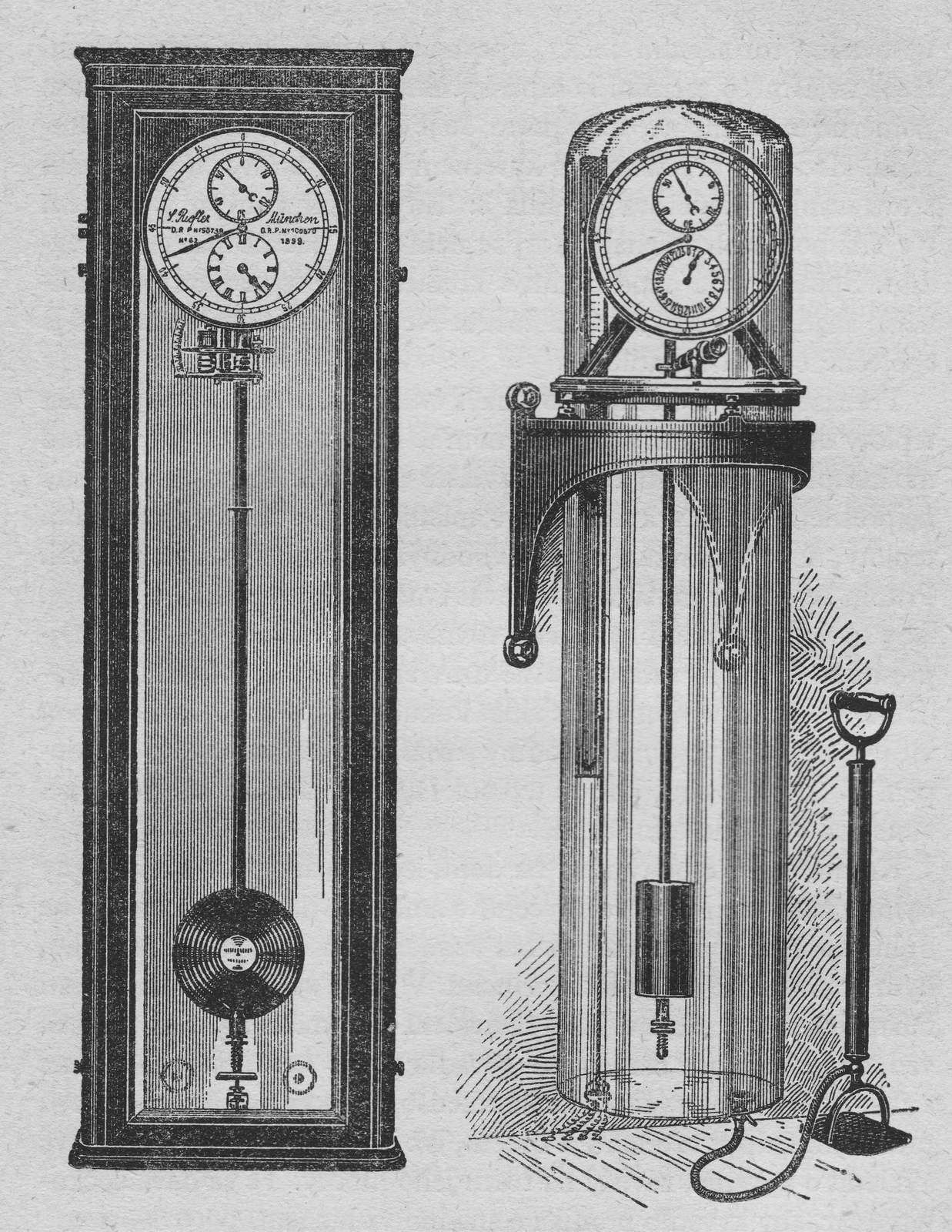
Riefler precision pendulum clocks

== In popular culture ==
Monroe mentions Sigmund Riefler in the "One Night Stand" episode in Season 3 of Grimm.

== Awards ==
- 1894 John Scott Medal of the Franklin Institute in Philadelphia, USA
- 1897 Honorary Doctorate (Dr. phil. h.c.) of the Faculty of Philosophy, Philosophy of Science and Religious Studies at LMU Munich
- 1899 Sigmund and both brothers received the honorary citizenship of the market town Nesselwang (new site since 1879 the company)
- 1900 Golden Delbrück-Denkmünze of the Verein zur Förderung des Gewerbefleißes in Prussia
- 1905 Kommerzienrat Title

== Patents ==
- 1889 DRP Nr. 50739 Doppelradhemmung für Chronometer mit vollkommen freier Unruhe und für Pendeluhren mit freiem Pendel.
- 1891 DRP Nr. 60059 Quecksilber-Kompensationspendel.
- 1893 US Patent 508530 Mercurial Compensation-Pendulum
- 1893 US Patent 508760 Pendulum-Escapement
- 1897 DRP Nr. 100870 Pendel mit Nickelstahlstange und mehreren zusammenwirkenden Compensationsröhren.
- 1903 DRP Nr. 151710 Elektrische Aufziehvorrichtung für Uhren mit einem treibenden Gewichtshebel und einem Elektromagneten zum Heben desselben.
- 1913 DRP Nr. 272119 Schwerkrafthemmung mit zwei Antriebshebeln.
