= Frederick Goulding =

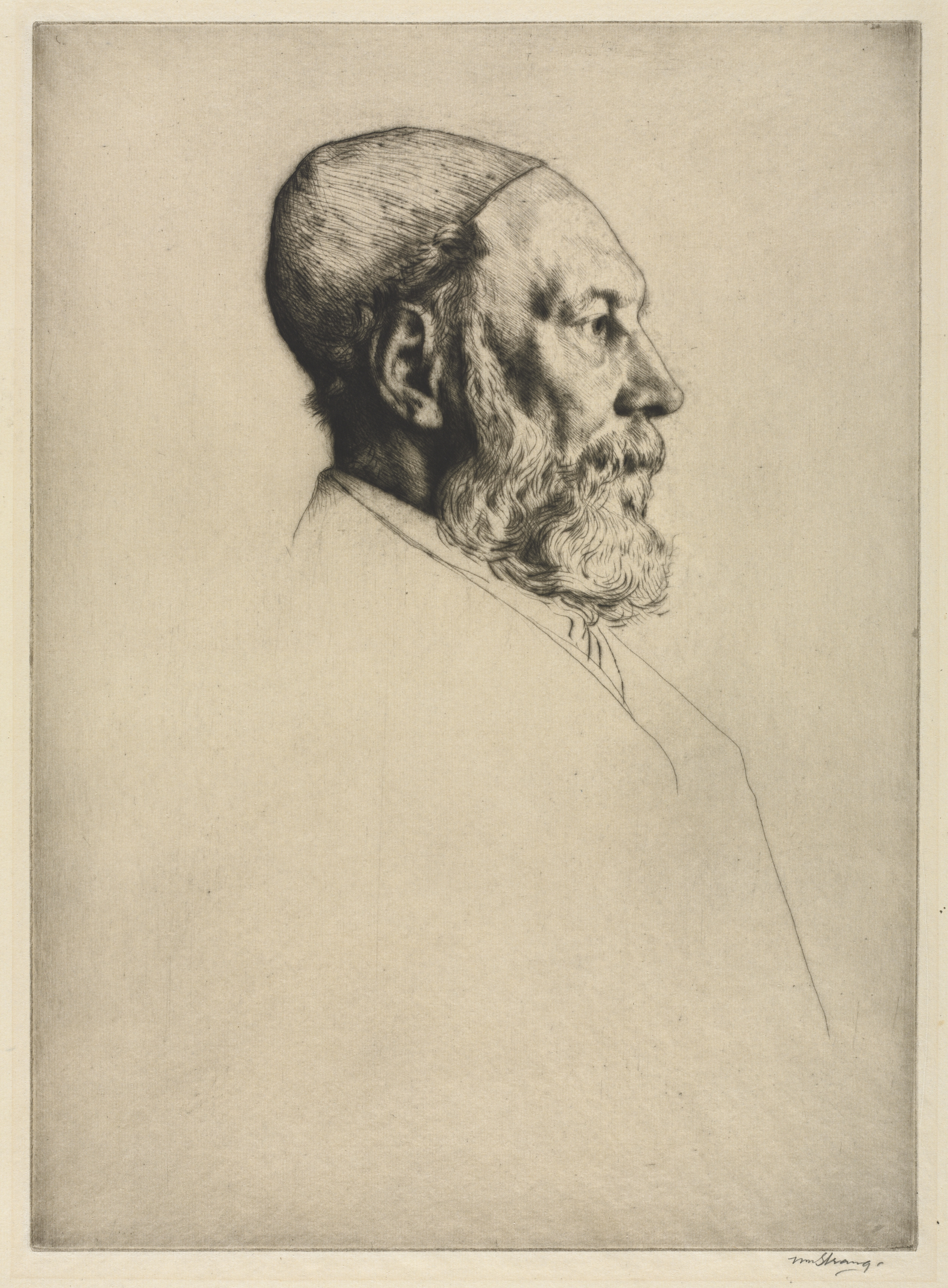
Drypoint of Frederick Goulding, by William Strang (1906)

Frederick Goulding (7 October 1842 – 5 March 1909) was an English printer of etchings and lithographs: a "master printer of copper plates".

== Life ==
Goulding was born in Islington. London, in 1842. His parents were John Fry Goulding, foreman printer to Messrs. Day & Son, and his wife Elizabeth née Rogers, who belonged to an old stock of Spitalfields weavers; his grandfather, John Golding, also a copper-plate printer, was apprenticed in 1779 to a still earlier William Golding, a copper-plate printer of St Botolph, Bishopsgate.

=== Education and early career ===
In 1854 Frederick Goulding was sent to a day school conducted at the National Hall, Holborn, by William Lovett, a well-known Chartist. In 1857 he was apprenticed to Messrs. Day & Son, 6 Gate Street, Lincoln's Inn Fields, originally a firm of lithographic printers, but then concerned largely with the printing of engravings, to which branch of their business Goulding was attached. In his spare time through 1858 and 1859 he studied at the schools of art in Wilmington Square, Clerkenwell, and Castle Street, Long Acre, also attending lectures at the Royal Academy School.

In 1859 he acted as "devil" to James MacNeill Whistler in the printing of some of his etchings, and in the same year assisted his father in printing a series of etchings by Queen Victoria and the Prince Consort. At the 1862 International Exhibition he gave a daily demonstration of copper-plate printing for Messrs. Day & Son, from May till November, and began there the friendship with Sir Francis Seymour Haden which lasted till the end of his life.

In 1865 he married Melanie Marie Alexandrine Piednue; they had three sons and a daughter.

=== Later career ===
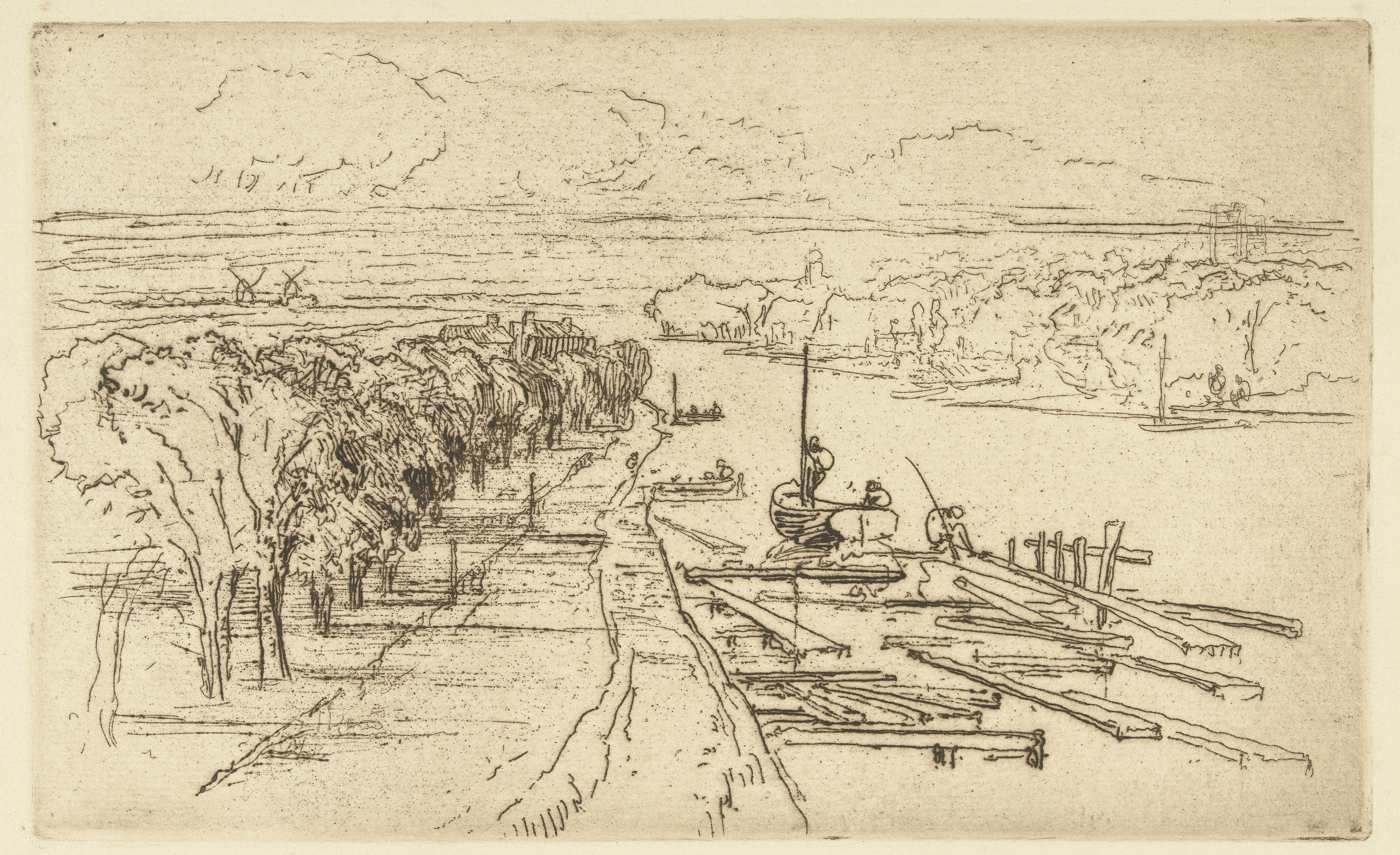
The Amstel by Francis Seymour Haden, printed by Goulding (1879)

By this time Goulding was a master of the "art and mystery" of his craft, and began to use his spare time in the evenings and on Saturdays by working for private clients at his own residence, Kingston House, 53 Shepherd's Bush Road. Among those for whom he printed were Seymour Haden, Alphonse Legros, Whistler, and Samuel Palmer. In 1881 he felt justified in embarking upon a printing business of his own, and built a studio, largely extended later, in the garden at the back of Kingston House. Among artists whose etchings he printed were Frank Short, William Strang, Joseph Pennell, Auguste Rodin, Charles Holroyd, Paul Adolphe Rajon and Robert Walker Macbeth; in fact few etchers or engravers did not claim Goulding's assistance. In About Etching (1879), Haden described Goulding as "the best printer of etchings in England just now".

From 1876 till 1882 he acted as assistant to Alphonse Legros in an etching class held weekly at the National Art Training School, now the Royal College of Art, and from 1882 to 1891, when he was succeeded by Sir Frank Short, was entirely responsible for the conduct of the class. From 1876 to 1879 he also assisted Legros in an etching class held at the Slade School. In February 1890 he was unanimously elected the first master printer to the Royal Society of Painter-Etchers.

In Goulding's case the craft of plate printing depended on something more than mere handicraft. He combined with remarkable dexterity of workmanship a singular understanding of each artist's aim, and so played no small part in the revival of etching in the nineteenth century. He also produced more than thirty etchings of his own, mostly landscapes of Amsterdam and Bruges.

He died of influenza, after five years' continuous ill health, on 5 March 1909, and was buried in Kensal Green Cemetery.
