= George Bennett Bowell =

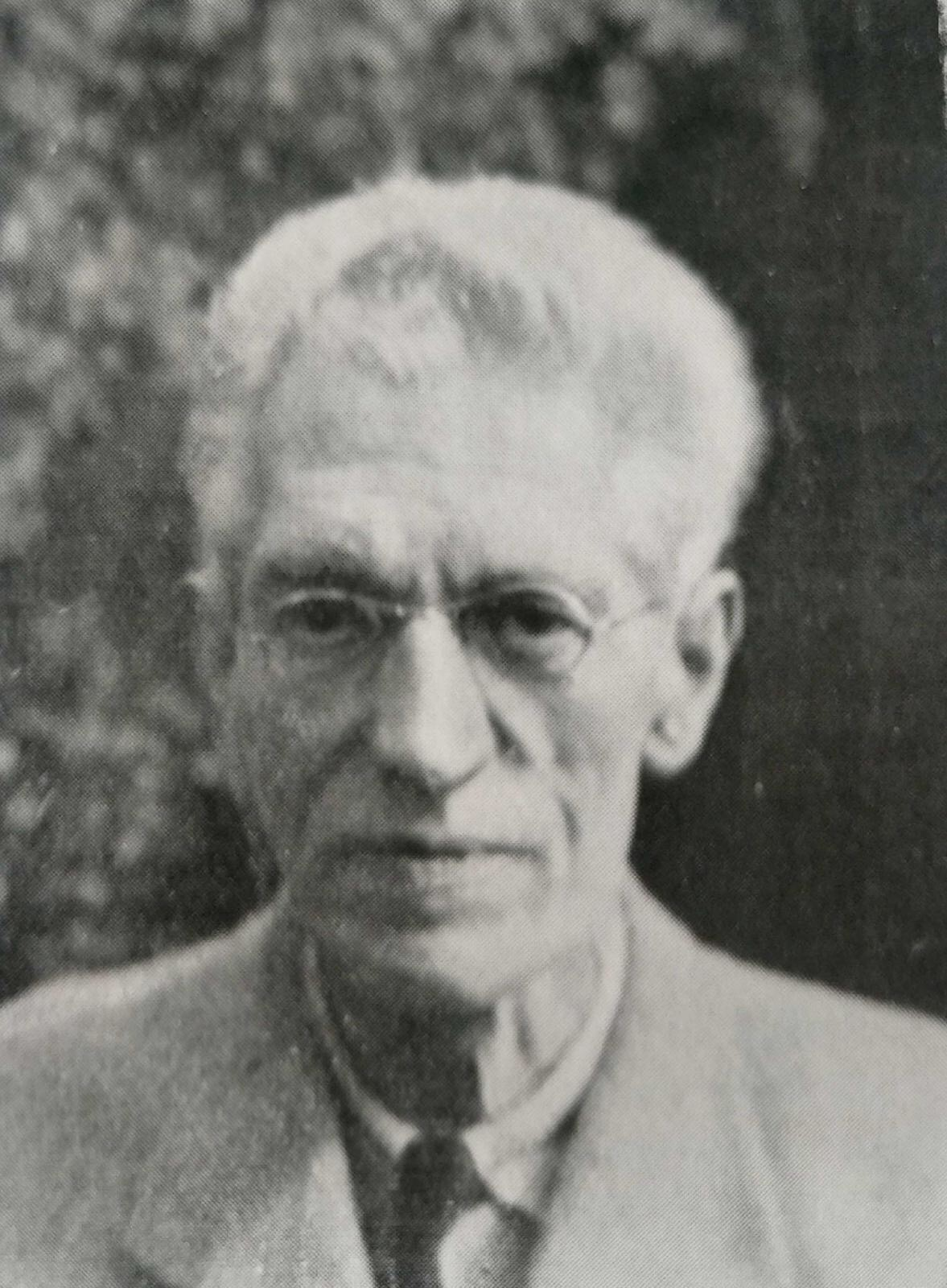
- The only known image of Bowell, from his March 1942 obituary in the Horological Journal

George Bennett Bowell (1875–1942) was a British horologist, best known for the invention of the 'Synchronome switch'.

He met Frank Hope-Jones when the two worked at the electric organ factory of Frank's brother, Robert Hope-Jones, around 1894. Bowell and Frank Hope-Jones experimented making new designs of electric clocks, and secured their first patent in 1895, which included the Synchronome switch. The pair moved to London to exploit their invention, establishing the Synchronome business. The Synchronome Syndicate Ltd was formed in 1897 as a precursor to a London Stock Exchange float, but when this failed, Bowell left in 1899, to pursue his own business.

Bowell worked for the Pearson Fire Alarm company for several years, though continuing to work on electric clock designs. He began promoting his own design of slave clock from 1906, and by 1910-11 was operating as the Silent Electric Clock Company, which was incorporated in 1912. The General Post Office used Bowell's design of master and slave clock system from 1910, installing a Silent Electric 'chronopher' at St Martins-le-Grand for distributing the Greenwich Time Service around the Post Office network. Bowell had abandoned the electrically reset Gravity escapement of the Synchronome system in favour of the electrically maintained pendulum design of Matthäus Hipp, and the Post Office used his basic design of clock, in telephone exchanges and for call-timing purposes, for much of the balance of the twentieth century.

Bowell abandoned time systems before World War I to work on designs for a kinematograph known as the 'Flikless'. This was a commercial failure and Bowell was bankrupted in 1915, spending much of the remaining war working in munition work. His patent record suggests he continued to work on film apparatus in the 1920s.

Bowell's last involvement in horology was in collaboration with Reginald Brabazon, 13th Earl of Meath, leading to a patent in 1937 for a clock escapement in which a constant force could be delivered, with unlocking independent of battery voltage.

Bowell married Phoebe March in June 1898. He died, aged 67, on 3 February 1942. In total, he was awarded thirty-two patents across five countries, of which twenty-two were British. His early collaborator, Frank Hope-Jones, contributed to Bowell's obituary, 'I understand that he met with an abundant share of the trials and difficulties which proverbially beset the inventor and that he failed to reap the reward due his skill and ingenuity. That must be attributed to his ill-health and his inventor's temperament, both ill weapons for fighting the battle of life'.

== Extra reading ==
- James Nye, 'Time to reconsider - The life and work of George Bennett Bowell (1875-1942)', Antiquarian Horology (March 2016), pp. 55–72.
- Frank Hope-Jones, Electrical Timekeeping (NAG: London,1940)
- R.H. Miles, Synchronome - Masters of Electrical Timekeeping (AHS: Ticehurst, 2011), pp. 6–12, 35, 43, 49, 76, 98, 199.
