= Roger Carpenter =

English neurophysiologist

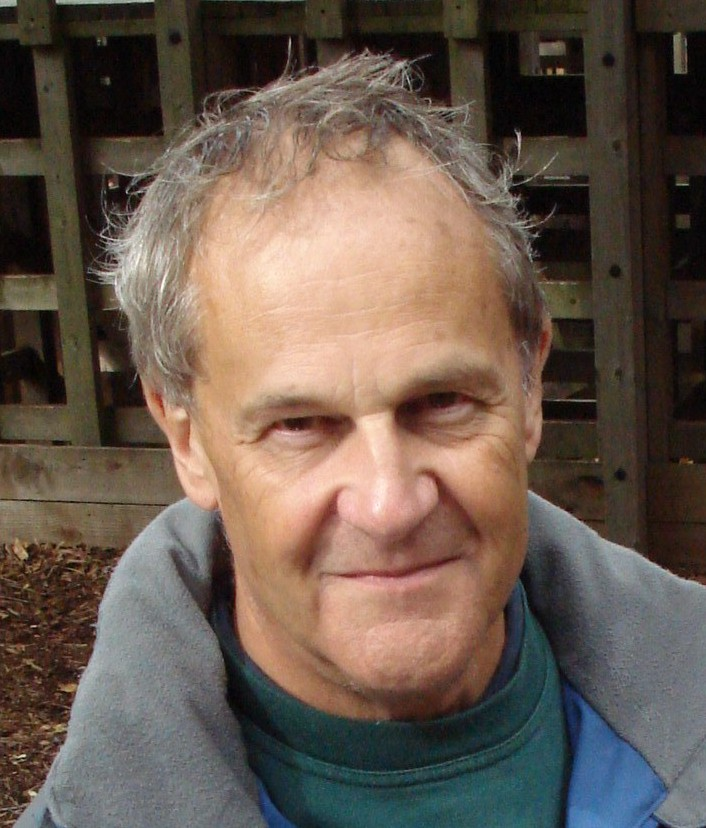
- Roger Carpenter
- Born: 2 September 1945
- Died: 27 October 2017 (aged 72)
- Citizenship: British
- Education: University of Cambridge
- Known for: publications
- Scientific career
- Workplaces: Cambridge

Professor Roger Hugh Stephen Carpenter (2 September 1945 – 27 October 2017) was an English neurophysiologist, Professor of Oculomotor Physiology at the University of Cambridge.

== Early life ==
Carpenter was educated at Gresham's School, Holt, Norfolk, where he was a member of Farfield (1958–1963), and then at Cambridge.

== Career ==
Before being appointed as Professor of Oculomotor Physiology in the University of Cambridge, Carpenter was a Director of Studies in Medicine at Caius College. In his principal field, mechanisms of consciousness, his position can be described as a one-way Cartesian. He was the creator of EPIC (the Experimental Physiology Instrumentation Computer) and NeuroLab, a set of interactive demonstrations on the working of the human brain.

In his spare time, he ran the CUDOS project (Cambridge University Distributed Opportunity Systems), aimed at using medical students' gap year between school and university. He directed the musical ensembles the Susato Consort and Susato Baroque Ensemble.

In 2000, Carpenter was one of a group of twenty inaugural winners of a National Teaching Award of £50,000 from the Institute for Learning and Teaching in Higher Education.

== Interests ==
Carpenter focussed on mechanisms of decision in his work. Measurement of saccadic latency, the time taken to choose a visual target and initiate an eye movement, is a reliable method for obtaining reaction time data. This work has inspired a model referred to as LATER (Linear Approach to Threshold with Ergodic Rate) to explain the decision mechanism. Technological advances enabled oculomotor measurements to be made both quickly and non-invasively, using micro-devices which have many clinical applications. He also had professional interests in vision in general, motor systems, and physiological mechanisms of consciousness.

On a Cambridge web site, Carpenter described himself as "Philosopher, mad scientist, and artiste extraordinaire".

== Selected publications ==
Genest, W., Hammond, R. & Carpenter, R. H. S. The random dot tachistogram: a novel task that elucidates the functional architecture of decision. Scientific Reports 2016; DOI: 10.1038/srep30787, 1-11

Noorani, I. & Carpenter, R. H. S. The LATER model of reaction time and decision. Neuroscience and Biobehavioral Reviews 2016; 64, 229–251.

Noorani, I., & Carpenter, R.H.S. Antisaccades as decisions: LATER model predicts latency distributions and error responses. European Journal of Neuroscience, 2013: 37 330-338

Carpenter, R. H. S., Reddi, B. A. J. Neurophysiology: A Conceptual Approach. 5th edition. London: Hodder, 2012.

Noorani, I, Gao, M. J., Pearson, B. C. & Carpenter, R. H. S. Predicting the timing of wrong decisions. Experimental Brain Research 2011; 209: 587-598

Anderson, A. J. & Carpenter, R. H. S. Saccadic latency in deterministic environments: getting back on track after the unexpected happens. Journal of Vision. 2010; 10:14 12

Carpenter, R. H. S., Reddi, B. A. J., & Anderson, A. J. A simple two-stage model predicts response time distributions. Journal of Physiology 2009. 587, 4051–4062.

Story, G. W. & Carpenter, R. H. S. Dual LATER-unit model predicts saccadic reaction time distributions in gap, step and appearance tasks. Experimental Brain Research. 2009; 193:287-296

Roos, J. C. P., Calandrini, D. M. & Carpenter, R. H. S. A single mechanism for the timing of spontaneous and evoked saccades. Experimental Brain Research. 2008;187:283-93.

Temel, Y., Visser-Vandewalle, V. & Carpenter, R. H. S. Saccadic latency during electrical stimulation of the human subthalamic nucleus. Current Biology. 2008;18:R412-4.

Oswal, A., Ogden, M. & Carpenter, R. H. S. The time-course of stimulus expectation in a saccadic decision task. Journal of Neurophysiology. 2007;97:2722-30.

Anderson, A. J. & Carpenter, R. H. S. The effect of stimuli that isolate S-cones on early saccades and the gap effect. Proceedings of the Royal Society B. 2007; 275:335-44.

Taylor, M. J., Carpenter, R. H. S. & Anderson, A. J. A noisy transform predicts saccadic and manual reaction times to changes in contrast. Journal of Physiology 2006; 573: 241-251

Carpenter, R. H. S. & Anderson, A. J. The death of Schrödinger's cat and of consciousness-based quantum wave-function collapse. Annales de la Fondation Louis de Broglie 2006; 31: 1-8

Sinha, N., Brown, J. T. G. & Carpenter, R. H. S. Task switching as a two-stage decision process. Journal of Neurophysiology 2006; 95: 3146–3153.

McDonald, S. A., Carpenter, R. H. S. & Shillcock R. C. An anatomically-constrained, stochastic model of eye movement control in reading. Psychological Review 2005; 112: 814–840.

Carpenter, R. H. S. Homeostasis: a plea for a unified approach. Advances in Physiology Education 2004; 28: S180-187.

Carpenter, R. H. S. Contrast, probability and saccadic latency: evidence for independence of detection and decision. Current Biology 2004; 14: 1576–1580.

Reddi, B. A. J. & Carpenter, R. H. S. Venous excess: a new approach to cardiovascular control and its teaching. Journal of Applied Physiology 2004; 98: 356–364.

Nouraei, S. A. R., de Pennington, N., Jones, J. G. & Carpenter, R. H. S. Dose-related effect of sevoflurane sedation on the higher control of eye movements and decision-making. British Journal of Anaesthesia 2003; 91: 175-83

Reddi, B. A. J. & Asrress, K. N. & Carpenter, R. H. S. Accuracy, information and response time in a saccadic decision task. Journal of Neurophysiology 2003; 90: 3538-46

Leach, J. C. D. & Carpenter, R. H. S. Saccadic choice with asynchronous targets: evidence for independent randomisation. Vision Research 2001; 41: 3437–45.

Carpenter, R. H. S. Express saccades: is bimodality a result of the order of stimulus presentation? Vision Research 2001; 41: 1145–1151.

Reddi, B. A. J. & Carpenter, R. H. S. The influence of urgency on decision time. Nature Neuroscience 2000; 3: 827–831.

Carpenter, R. H. S. A neural mechanism that randomises behaviour. Journal of Consciousness Studies 1999; 6: 13–22.

Carpenter, R. H. S, & Kinsler, V. Saccadic eye movements while reading music. Vision Research 1995; 35: 1447–1458.

Carpenter, R. H. S. & Williams, M. L. L. Neural computation of log likelihood in the control of saccadic eye movements. Nature 1995; 377: 59–62.

Carpenter, R. H. S. Movements of the Eyes. 2nd edition. London: Pion, 1988.

Carpenter, R. H. S. Cerebellectomy and the transfer-function of the vestibulo-ocular reflex in the decerebrate cat. Proceedings of the Royal Society B 1972; 181: 353-374
