= Robert Aagaard =

English furniture maker, conservator, and magistrate

Robert Aagaard OBE JP

Magistrate

Personal details
- Born: 27 June 1932 Norwich, Norfolk, England
- Died: 1 April 2001 (aged 68)
- Spouse: Fiona

Robert Aagaard OBE JP (/ˈeɪɡɑːrd/ AY-gard; 27 June 1932 – 1 April 2001) was an English furniture maker and conservator, magistrate, and founder of the youth movement Cathedral Camps.

== Early life ==
The son of Villien Valdemar Aagaard and Florence Aagard (née Brooke), Aagaard was born at Norwich, Norfolk, in 1932, after his father's family had migrated from Denmark at the time of the rise of Fascism in Germany. He was educated at the junior and senior schools of Gresham's School (at Newquay, and then Holt, Norfolk), from 1941 to 1949, where he was a member of Farfield, one of Gresham's boarding houses. His exact contemporaries at Farfield included Martin Burgess, later a master clockmaker.

== Life and career ==
After completing his National Service, Aagaard worked at Woolworth's, a company of which his father was a director. However, his love of antique furniture led him to train as a furniture maker, in the Cotswolds, and at Harrogate, Yorkshire. At Harrogate he had his own showrooms and operated a factory at Knaresborough, which made period fireplaces and decorations needed by conservation schemes, with 30 employees.

Aagaard was managing director of Robert Aagaard Ltd (Antiques), from 1960 to 1980, the company's consultant from 1980 to 1995; a Director of Aagaard-Hanley Ltd, Fibrous Plasterers, from 1970 to 1980. He was a consultant from 1980 until his death, and worked at Robert Aagaard & Co., Period Chimneypieces and Marble Processing from 1995. He acted as a specialist consultant to the National Trust, supervising important projects in England and Scotland. He was the Secretary of the Harrogate Antiques Fair. He became a Justice of the Peace for North Yorkshire, serving as a magistrate on the Harrogate bench for 20 years.

In 1980, Aagaard and his wife Fiona founded the Cathedral Camps, a youth movement recognised as a residential section of the Duke of Edinburgh's Award, and served as its chairman until his death. The beginning of the movement came when the dean of Ripon Cathedral asked Aagaard to organise on a voluntary basis the restoration of a house owned by the cathedral. While this work was in hand, Aagaard visited his son at a National Trust Acorn Camp and realised that cathedrals could also harness the enthusiasm of young people, training them as volunteer labour and giving them in return an interesting working holiday.

In the early 1980s, the Aagaards raised funds and found trustees, including architects, artists, and cathedral deans. Establishing a supply of suitable tools and conservation materials, insurance, accommodation, and transport all needed careful planning. In the 20 years during which Aagaard headed the organisation, Cathedral Camps enabled some 9000 students to spend time working and living in cathedrals. Camps were organised every year at 24 centres, mostly English cathedrals, but also some larger parish churches and some Church of Scotland, free church, and Roman Catholic places of worship.

Aagaard was a churchwarden at Knaresborough and from 1995 a member of the General Synod of the Church of England. He was Chairman of the Ripon Diocesan Advisory Committee and a member of the Ripon Cathedral Fabric Advisory Committee from 1993, a member of the Bradford Cathedral Fabric Advisory Committee from 1997, of the Cathedrals' Fabric Commission for England, from 1995, and of the Ripon Diocese Redundant Churches Uses Committee, from 1984.

== Private life ==
In 1960, Aagaard married Fiona Christine Drury, and they had two sons and one daughter.

In Who's Who, he gave his recreations as "Gardening, walking" and his address in the year of his death as Manor House, High Birstwith, Harrogate, North Yorkshire.

Aagaard has an early place in any alphabetical list, and in May 2020 his entry in the combined index of Who Was Who was first out of 131,546 entries. Second came Professor Alvar Aalto.

== Honours ==
- Officer of the Order of the British Empire, 1993
