= Farfield =

Boarding house at Gresham's School

Coordinates: 52.9108°N 1.1066°E

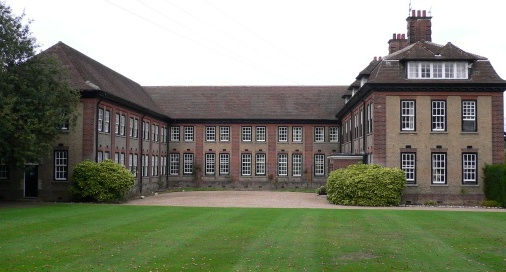
Farfield House, Holt

Farfield is one of the seven boarding houses at Gresham's, an English public school at Holt, Norfolk.

Farfield is currently home to approximately fifty boys.

== History and traditions ==
Farfield was the third new boarding house to be built at the school, following its move from the town centre to the Cromer Road at the beginning of the 20th century, in a surge of renewal and expansion at Gresham's led by George Howson. Completed in 1911, it was shortly followed by a new school chapel.

The first housemaster, Major J. C. Miller, and boys were transferred from a smaller house called Bengal Lodge (now Kenwyn, a house of the Gresham's junior school). The school magazine noted that a useful donkey was being kept in an outbuilding at Farfield.

The young Benjamin Britten recorded his life at Farfield in the 1920s and 1930s in his diaries. In 1929, he mentions that the house then had two "sickrooms" of its own. He commented that the Honours System was a positive failure, as "It is no good trying the Honours System on boys who have no honour."

The school was evacuated to Newquay in Cornwall during the years 1940–1945, but the division into houses was continued there, and Farfield occupied the Pentire Hotel. There were thus some Farfield boys who never set foot in the house.

The traditions of the house include an Entertainment, held every March, which features music, sketches, and dramatic scenes. The ritual of House Prayers is maintained in Farfield on three evenings of the week. This is a short evening service, organised by the prefects, which consists of a hymn, a reading, and a prayer, and concludes with the familiar mantra "Goodnight Boys".

The symbol of Farfield is an owl. This dates from 1949, when the wife of the housemaster, Mr Andrew Bruce Douglas, pointed out how much a wooden owl belonging to a boy called Simpson looked like her husband, and it was adopted as the house mascot.

On 24 September 2011, Farfield marked its centenary, with events attended by 160 old boys and four old housemasters. After Evensong in the School Chapel, a Farfield Broadcasting House entertainment was led by Paddy O'Connell, followed by a banquet in Big School.

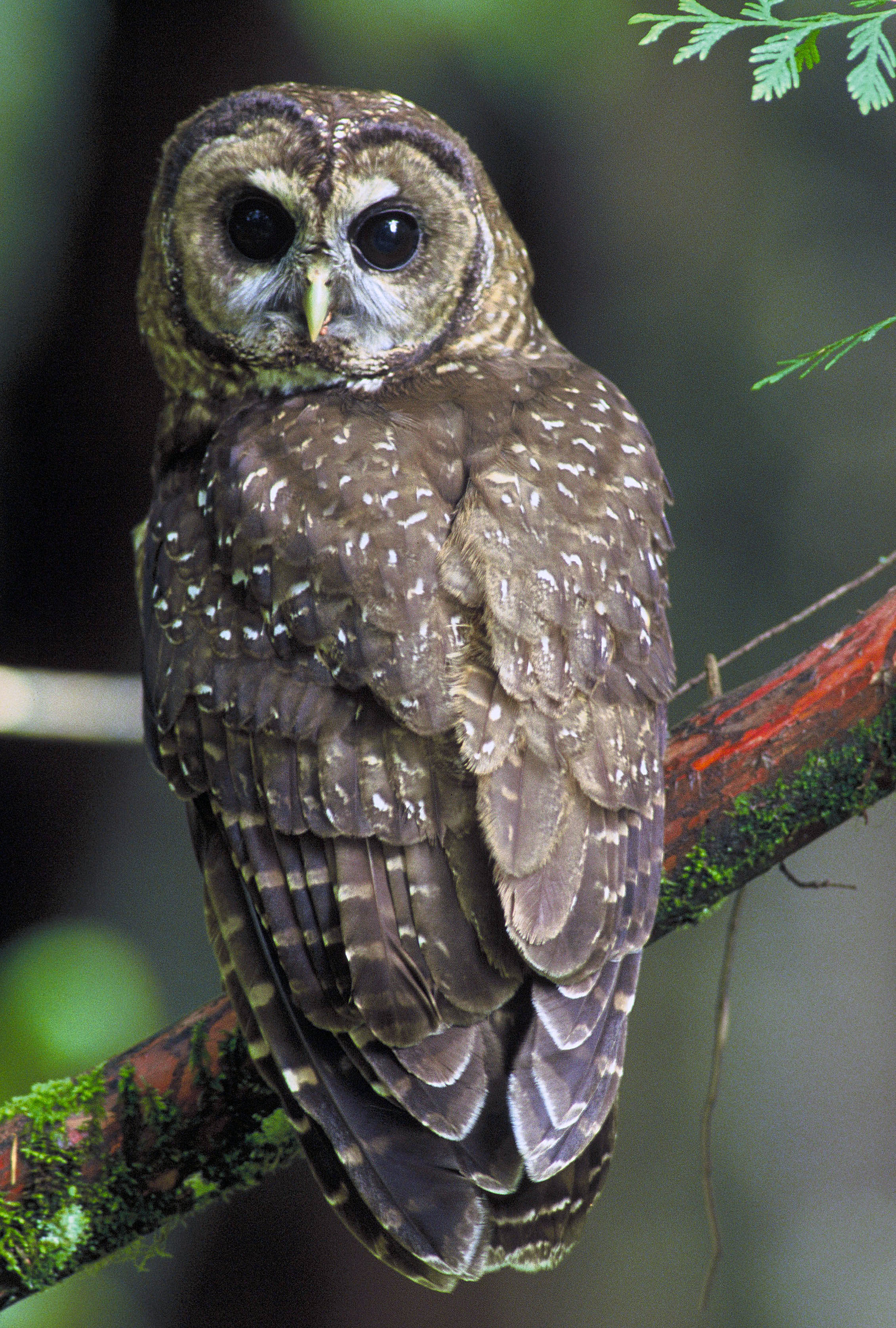
The symbol of Farfield is an owl

== Geography ==
The main Farfield House building is H-shaped and faces the Cromer Road, which lies to the south beyond a wide green space. A short distance away to the north is the Auden Theatre, named after a Farfield old boy. Boarders live on the first floor and in the new wing, in individual bed-sitters, with separate corridors for each year group. Day boys each share a study on the ground floor with another member of their age group, and there is a large common room, formerly the dining hall, where a roll-call takes place at 8:10 every morning for both boarders and day-boys. There is also a computer room.

The Farfield House Guide states that "Alcohol can only be administered by the Housemaster at special events".

Between August and September, the Farfield Lawn is home to a colony of the orchid Spiranthes spiralis, also known as Autumn Ladies'-tresses, which was once among the finest such colonies in Great Britain.

The grand piano in the common room is a Bechstein given by the Worshipful Company of Fishmongers. It is believed that Benjamin Britten used it to compose his anthem A Hymn to the Virgin.

== Housemasters ==
| Major J. C. Miller^{*} | 1904–1920 |
| E. A. Robertson | 1920–1928 |
| G. R. Thompson | 1929–1936 |
| A. B. Douglas | 1936–1957 |
| B. W. Sankey | 1957–1965 |
| W. O. Thomas | 1965–1980 |
| R. W. Coleman | 1980–1988 |
| G. B. Worrall | 1988–1998 |
| A. A. Edwards | 1998–2003 |
| J. R. P. Thomson | 2003–2013 |
| D. J. Atkinson | 2013–2021 |
| T. Burnett | 2021– |

_{* in Bengal Lodge until 1911}

== Assistant Housemasters ==
| David Beaney | 1984–1998 |
| Spencer Coates | 1998–2000 |
| John Seaman | 2000–2002 |
| Adam Stanworth | 2002–2008 |
| Andrew 'Freddie' Grounds | 2008–2011 |
| David Saker | 2011–2019 |
| Tom Burnett | 2019-2021 |
| James Beales | 2021– |

== Notable old boys ==
Many old boys have achieved success or notoriety. Names are in chronological order, and the years at Farfield (or its predecessor Bengal Lodge) are given in round brackets.

- Dr Hildebrand Hervey FRS (1902–1906) – marine biologist
- Lord Reith (1904–1906) – first Director General of the BBC, later politician
- Donald Cunnell (1909–1910) – World War I flying ace who shot down and injured the Red Baron
- Tom Wintringham (1912–1915) General Strike planner, commander of the British contingent of the International Brigades in the Spanish Civil War, founder of The Daily Worker (subsequently The Morning Star)
- W. H. Auden (1920–1925) – poet
- Benjamin Britten (1928–1930) – composer and conductor
- Norman Cohn (1929–1933) – historian and Fellow of the British Academy
- Bill Mason (1929–1934) – film director and father of Pink Floyd drummer Nick Mason
- David Hand (1932–1937) – Archbishop of Papua New Guinea
- Major General A. E. Younger (1933–1937) – soldier
- John Bradburne (1934–1939) – soldier, missionary
- Sir Philip Dowson (1938–1942) – architect and President of the Royal Academy
- Robert Aagaard (1944–1949), furniture maker and founder of the youth movement Cathedral Camps
- Martin Burgess (1944–1949) – master clockmaker
- Dr Anthony Yates (1946–1948) – rheumatologist
- Dr Colin Leakey (1947–1952) – botanist
- Sir John Tusa (1949–1954) – TV presenter and managing director of the BBC World Service
- Stephen Frears (1954–1959) – film director
- Robert Eagle (1961–1965) – writer and director
- Roger Carpenter (1958–1963) – neurophysiologist
- Nigel Dick (1966–1971) – music video director
- Jeremy Bamber (1974–1979) – convicted for five murders
- Matt Arnold (1975–1980) – television presenter
- Nick Youngs (1976–1978) – England rugby union footballer
- Paddy O'Connell (1979–1983) – BBC radio and television presenter
- Ralph Firman (1988–1993) – Formula One racing driver

== Roll of honour ==
The Following Old Boys of Bengal Lodge and Farfield gave their lives during the Great War of 1914–1918:

Armitage SW, Aveling LN, Barratt GR, Beeton RH, Biden LTGV, Brownsword DA, Cole AH, Crosse ECM, Crosse MEB, Cunnell DC, Davies LFStJ, Ellis JC, Frost GK, Johnson GB, Kirch C, Robinson HHK, Rumsby RW, Shepherd CA, Simpson JH, Thorn H, Wilson Ian Maclean & Wright JMS

        
