= Edward Daniel Johnson =

English watch and marine chronometer maker (1818–1889)

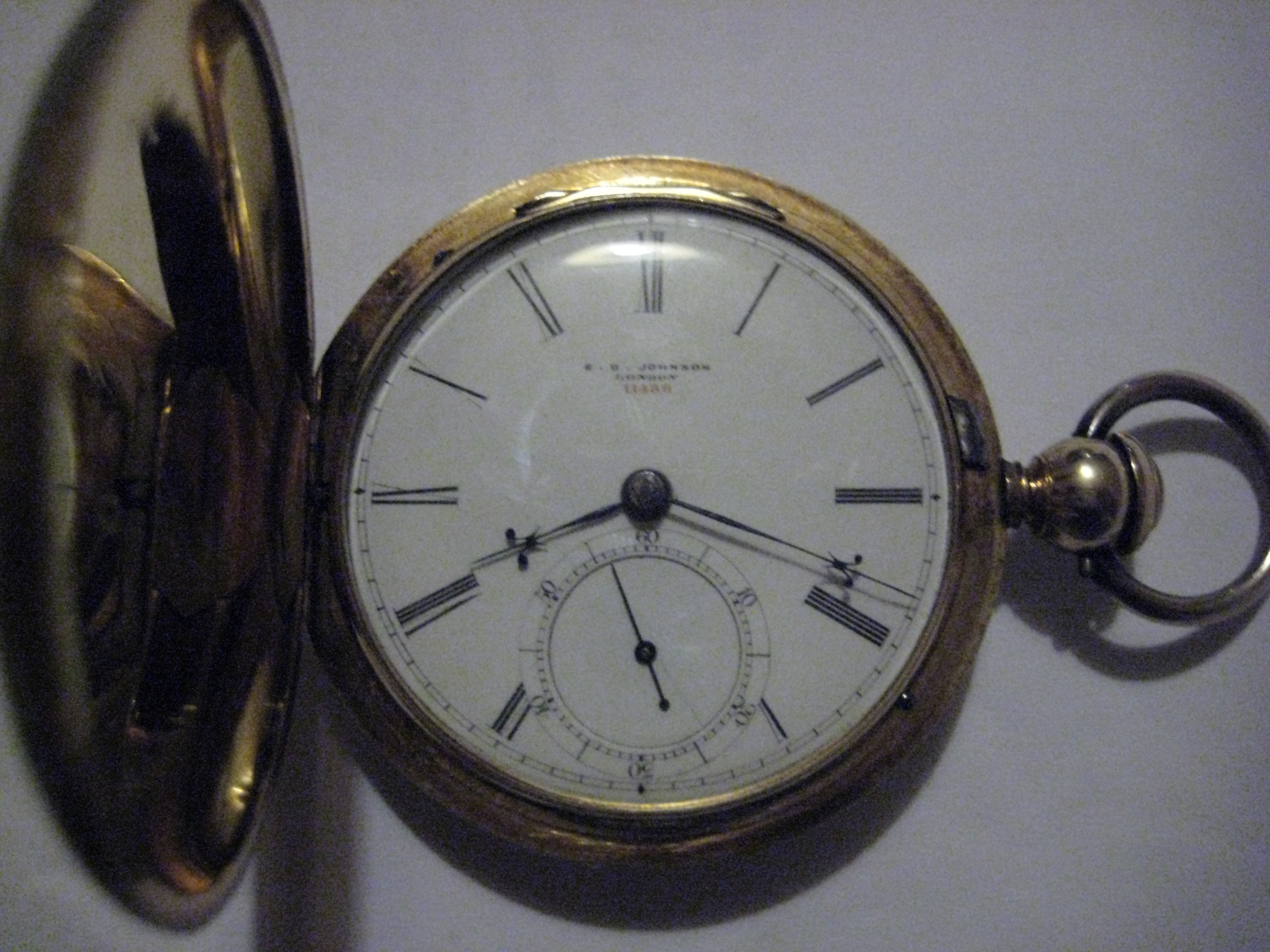
Pocket watch made by Johnson.

Edward Daniel Johnson (30 September 1815 – 8 March 1889) was an English watch and marine chronometer maker from London. He was a founder member and vice President of the British Horological Institute, which was formed in June 1858.

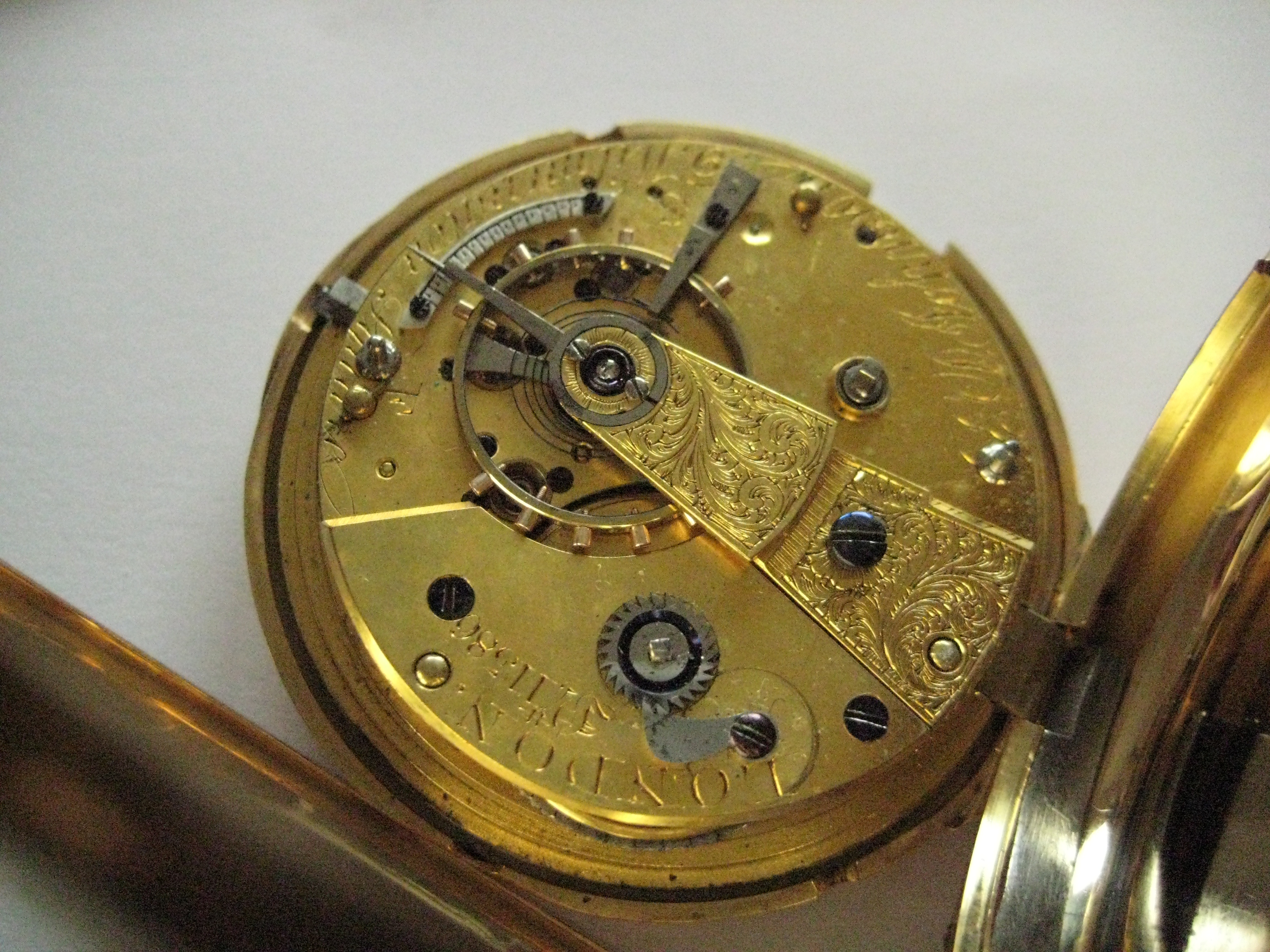
Movement of a pocket watch made by Johnson. Inscription: No. 11586 E. D. Johnson 9 Wilmington Square London.

During his early career he worked out of Ashley Crescent in Shoreditch. Watches from this period (c. 1849–1855) show the address as "21 Ashley Crescent, City Road, London" inscribed on the movement.

In 1855, he moved to 9 Wilmington Square, Clerkenwell where he produced the majority of his work. It was during this period that Johnson was involved with the founding of the British Horological Institute. Johnson was granted the Freedom of the City of London on 17 January 1860 by Redemption in the Company of Clockmakers.

He was elected a fellow of the Royal Astronomical Society on 10 May 1861.

In June 1873, the British Horological Institute ran an essay competition, sponsored by Baroness Burdett-Coutts. Johnson was involved with this, the title of which was "The Compensation Balance and its Adjustment in Chronometers and Watches".

From 1875, the company was listed as "Edward Daniel Johnson & Son". Two of his sons worked in the watch manufacturing industry—Edward Henry and William George. The 'son' is believed to refer to Edward given that he lived at 10 Wilmington Square, which was inscribed on E. D. Johnson watch movements at this time.

Johnson retired in 1879, by which time he was almost totally blind.
