= British Horological Institute =

Representative body of the UK horological industry

Coordinates: 53.082672°N 0.904158°W

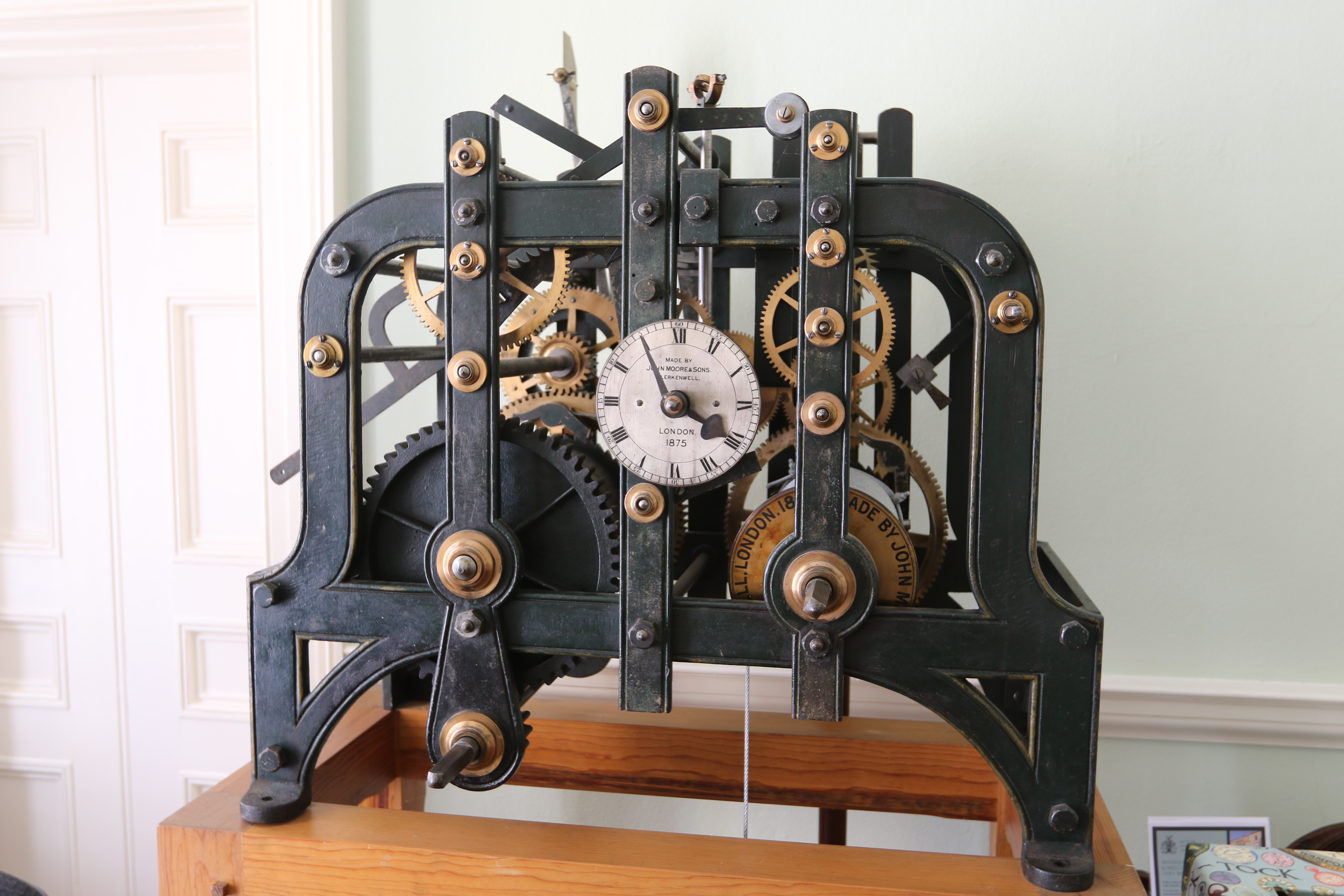
A turret clock in the museum display

The British Horological Institute (BHI) is the representative body of the horological industry in the United Kingdom. It was founded by a group of clockmakers in 1858, and has its current premises at Upton Hall in Nottinghamshire, which includes a museum of clock history.

== History ==
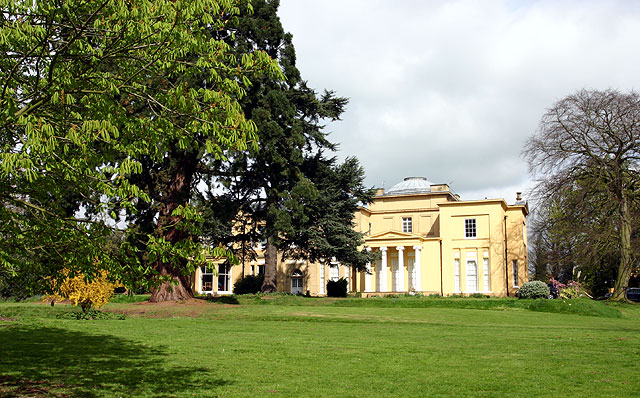
Upton Hall

The BHI was founded in 1858 by a small group of clockmakers, one of whom was Edward Daniel Johnson. Their aim was to unify the British horological industry and trades in the face of large numbers of imports of clocks and watches from abroad. The institute was an immediate success and within a year it had founded its own museum and library; it also began to offer evening classes in clock- and watch-making.

The journal of the institute is the Horological Journal, which has been published monthly since September 1858. It is the oldest continuously published technical journal in the world.

== Upton Hall ==
The current premises of the BHI are at Upton Hall in Nottinghamshire, England. Its primary role is that of education, providing a standardised set of examinations for training horologists. It also maintains a list of members whom it considers sufficiently qualified to repair clocks and watches, and who adhere to a strict code of practice. Upton Hall is also home to the charitable Museum of Timekeeping at the British Horological Institute, which includes the original BHI Museum and Library.

== Membership ==
The institute offers a number of different kinds of membership. These include:

Associate Membership
Any individual with an interest in horology may subscribe as a member.
Accredited: Member of the BHI (MBHI)

BHI members can gain accredited Member-level status by passing the BHI examinations at Level 4. Accredited members at this level may use the postnominals MBHI.

Accredited: Fellow of the BHI (FBHI)

The next level of BHI accreditation is Fellowship. This can be gained by passing the BHI examinations at Level 5 or by making a successful application to the BHI based upon outstanding career achievements. Accredited members at this level may use the postnominals FBHI.

Corporate membership and business partnership are also available.

== Museum of Timekeeping ==
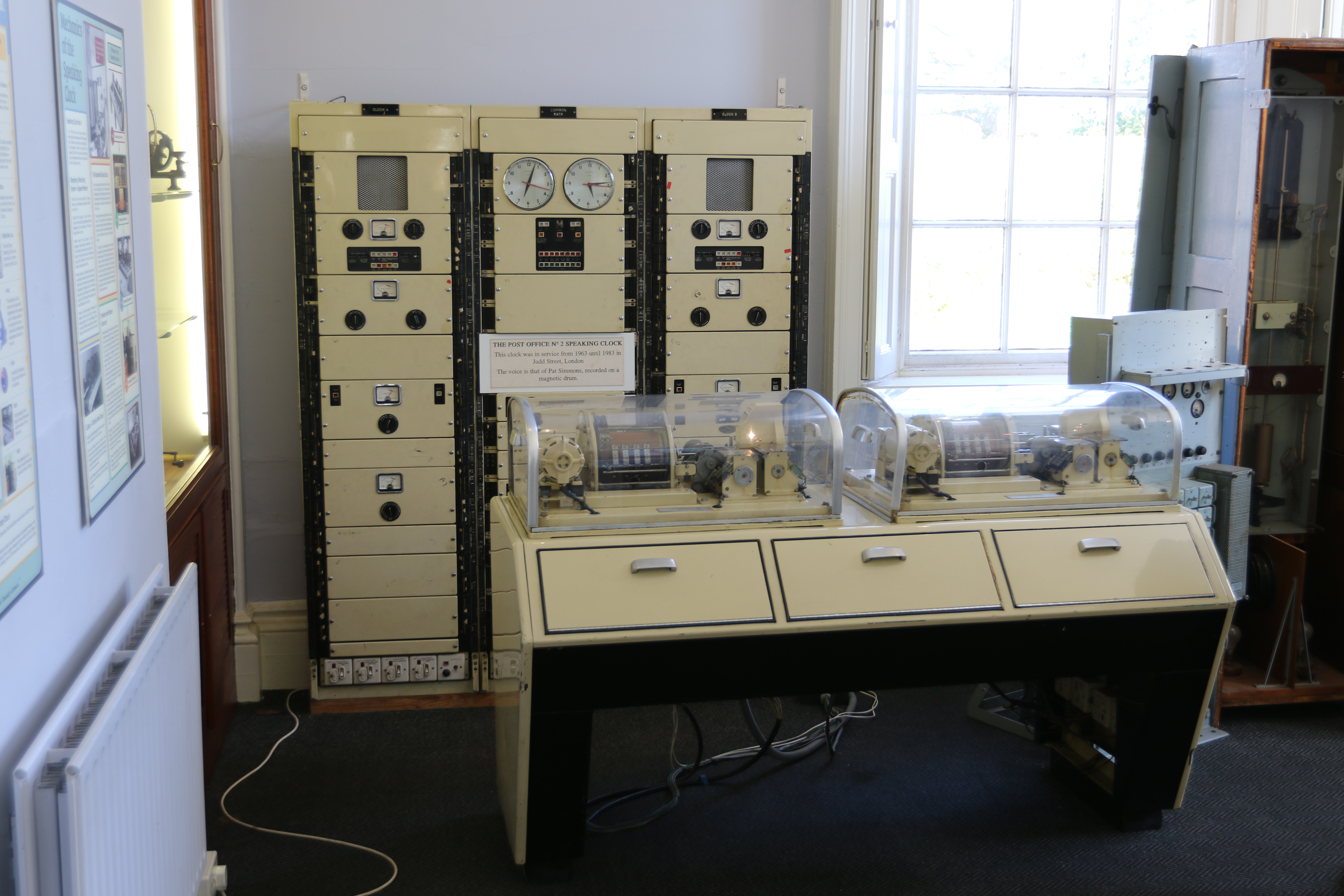
A Post Office speaking clock machine, on display at the museum

The Museum of Timekeeping is also housed at the home of the British Horological Institute.

The Museum of Timekeeping is an independent charitable Museum (Registered Charity Number 1176495), established in 1994 to hold in trust the collection and library, brought together by BHI members since its founding in 1858.

The Museum includes a collection of clocks, watches and timepieces and associated clock and watchmaking tools and ephemera. It can be visited during seasonal opening hours, plus a range of special events, or by booking a private group visit.

The Museum of Timekeeping Library is one of very few existing specialised libraries dealing primarily with horology. It is open to researchers by appointment, and its holding includes a number of rare documents, papers, letters and books, particularly dealing with the high points of British horology in the 18th and early 19th century, but its catalogue contains comparatively few titles published in the last several decades. An exception is THROUGH THE GOLDEN AGE – Charles Gretton – Watch and Clockmaking, a 660-page volume about the life, era, and creations of celebrated clockmaker and watchmaker Charles Gretton (1647–1731), published in 2016.

== BHI Gold Medal ==
The institute's gold medal for an outstanding contribution to horology has been awarded to:

- 1928 Frank Watson Dyson - Astronomer Royal who introduced Greenwich pips.
- 1930 Charles Édouard Guillaume - developed Invar and Elinvar
- 1931 William Hamilton Shortt (1881-1971) - noted horologist who devised the Shortt–Synchronome clock
- 1946 Frank Hope-Jones (1867–1950) - developed electrical timekeeping, including Synchronome system
- 1947 Rupert Gould - restored John Harrison's chronometer
- 1947 Warren Alvin Marrison - developed the quartz crystal clock
- 1948 Harold Spencer Jones - Astronomer Royal
- 1957 John Harwood - invented the self-winding wristwatch
- 1981 George Daniels - developed the co-axial escapement now used by the Omega watch company.
