= Frank Hope-Jones =

British horologist

Frank Hope-Jones (1867–1950) was a British horologist. He was the founder of the electronic clock company Synchronome, which found success in 1921 with the Shortt-Synchronome clock. He was also influential in the development of wireless radio technology in the United Kingdom.

== Early life and family ==
He was born the son of William Hope-Jones in Eastham, Wirral Peninsula and educated at Birkenhead School. His brother was Robert Hope-Jones, the electric organ designer. His parents were from Ruthin, Wales.

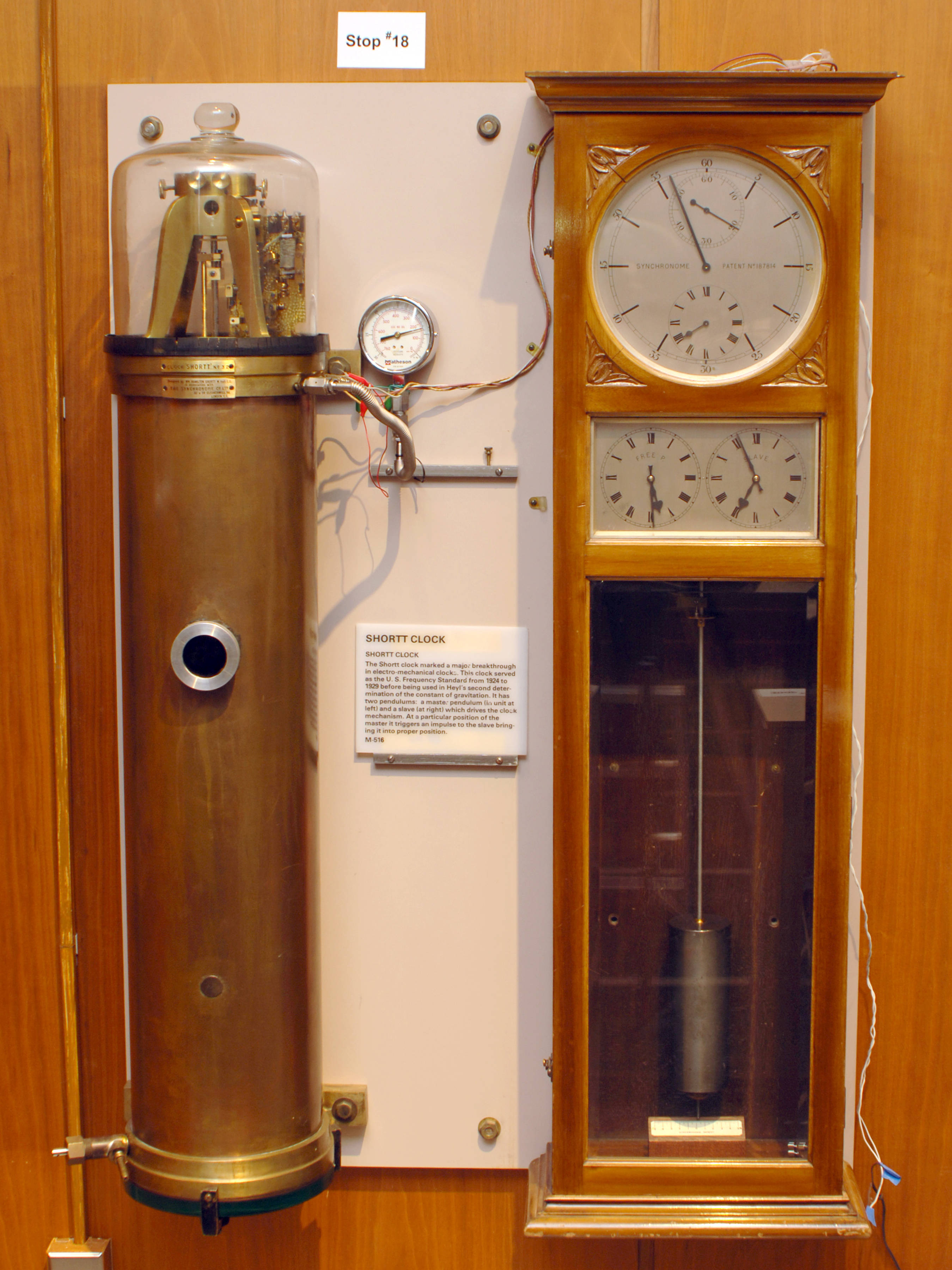
Shortt-Synchronome clock in US National Institute of Standards and Technology museum, Gaithersburg, Maryland

== Career ==
=== Early interest in electronics, formation of Synchronome ===
Frank became interested in electrical apparatus when his elder brother Robert worked for a telephone company and assisted him when he began designing and building electric organs. Frank himself moved into the field of electric clocks and together with George Bennett Bowell founded the Synchronome business in 1895, the same year that the pair secured an important patent, embodying the 'Synchronome switch'. They formed the Synchronome Syndicate Company of London in 1897 with the assistance of company promoters. Following an aborted plan to float the firm on the London Stock Exchange in 1899, Bowell left to pursue his own interests. Hope-Jones continued the business, trading as the Synchronome Company, which was only finally incorporated in 1912.

=== Success of the Shortt-Synchronome clock ===
The Synchronome company manufactured electrically operated master clocks, all utilizing the Synchronome switch patented in 1895, with later improvements. These were pendulum clocks which were automatically impulsed every half minute by mechanical means, the mechanism then being reset electrically. William Hamilton Shortt, a gifted railway engineer, joined the Synchronome Company in 1912 as a director, contributing towards efforts to create precision pendulum clocks. First attempts met with little success, and efforts were interrupted by the Great War, but Shortt persisted, and in 1921 was vindicated with the remarkable success of the Shortt-Synchronome clock. Such clocks were the most accurate available prior to the development of the quartz crystal and atomic clocks.

=== Radio signals ===
He was also interested in timekeeping via radio signals and in 1913 Synchronome started to manufacture the Horophone, a device for capturing radio time signals. He was highly influential in the promulgation of wireless technology, and was elected the first chairman of the Wireless Society of London in 1913, a post he occupied for ten years. In 1921, Hope-Jones orchestrated a petition from the Wireless Society of London to the Postmaster General, urging the authorities to permit renewed wireless transmissions, following a wartime ban, and this document was pivotal in securing government agreed to permit public transmissions by Marconi and later by the BBC from its 2LO radio station. In 1924, legislation made Daylight Saving Time permanent, as opposed to a temporary measure, first introduced in the war. Hope-Jones personally announced the arrival of Summer Time in a broadcast on 12 April 1924, from a new BBC studio. He also suggested to the BBC that they should transmit a time signal and in 1925 the Greenwich Time Signal pips were first broadcast.

== Publications ==
In 1931, he published Electric Clocks (NAG Press), which offered a comprehensive survey of the field of electrical horology, with some emphasis on the Synchronome system for which Hope-Jones remained a tireless canvasser. He reworked and updated the material significantly to produce Electrical Timekeeping (NAG Press) in 1940, which was again revised for a new edition in 1949. This remained the key English language publication on electrical horology, until R. H. Miles published Synchronome – Masters of Electrical Timekeeping (AHS) in 2011.

== Awards and recognition ==
In 1946 he was awarded the Gold Medal of the British Horological Institute.

== Death and personal life ==
He died in April 1950 at his home in Richmond, Surrey, at the age of 83. He had married Florence M. Gask (née Tippett) in 1917. They had a daughter Agnes.
