= Riefler escapement =

Mechanical escapement for pendulum clocks

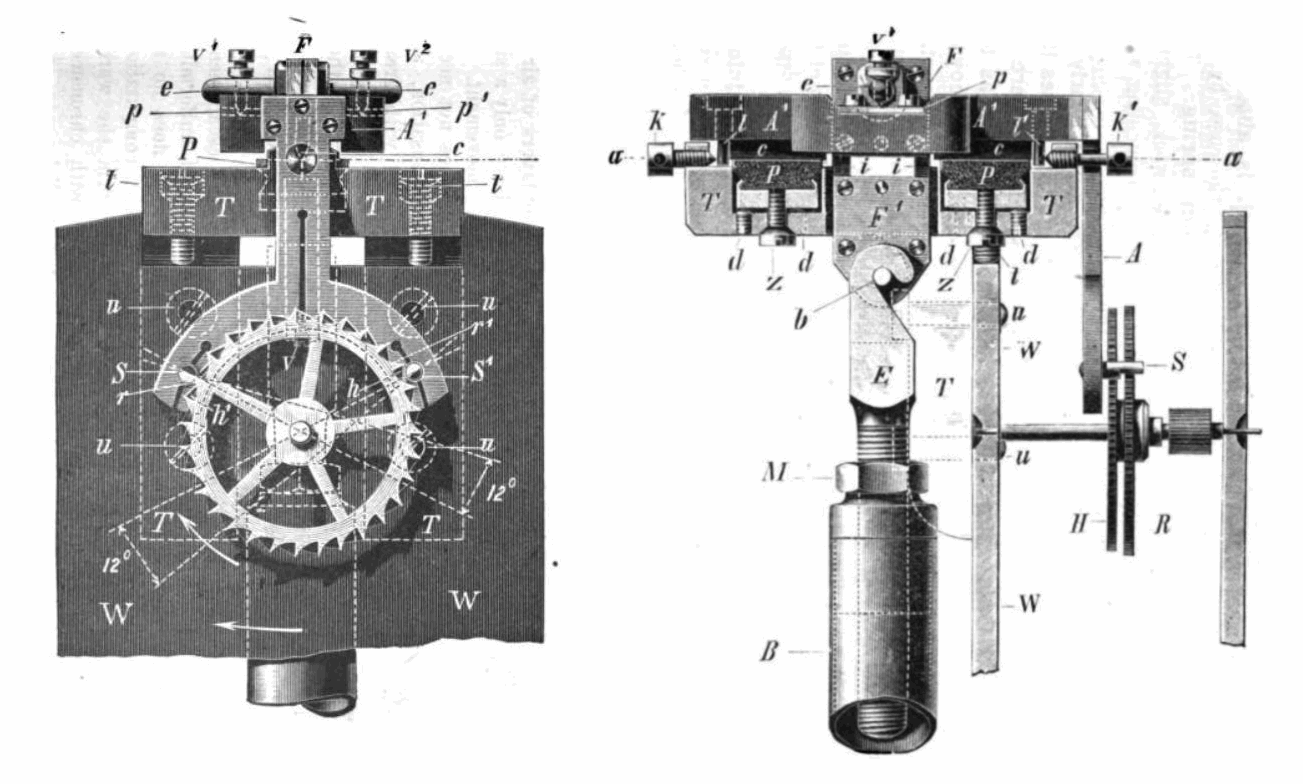
Riefler escapement used in the Clemens Riefler regulator clock, 1893. Shows the bearer (A'), knife edges (c), agate support surfaces (P), suspension spring (i), locking escape wheel (h), impulse escape wheel (H), and pallets (S,S').

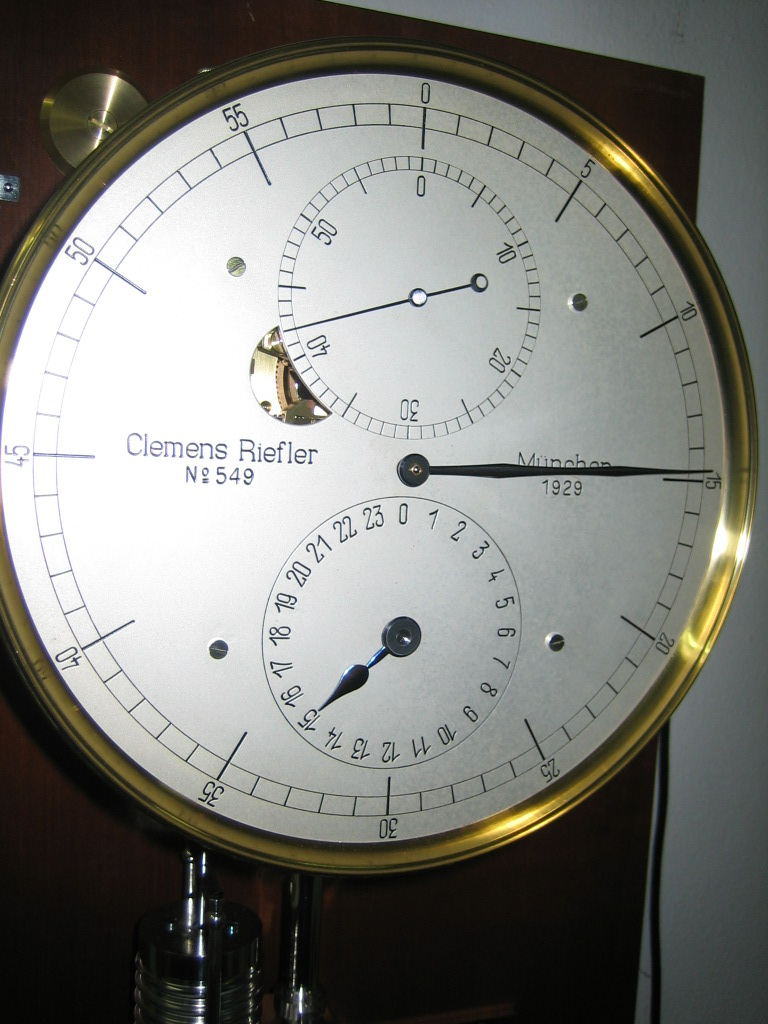
The Riefler precision pendulum clock No. 549, currently (2006) serving as the workshop regulator in the horological workshop of the Deutsches Museum.

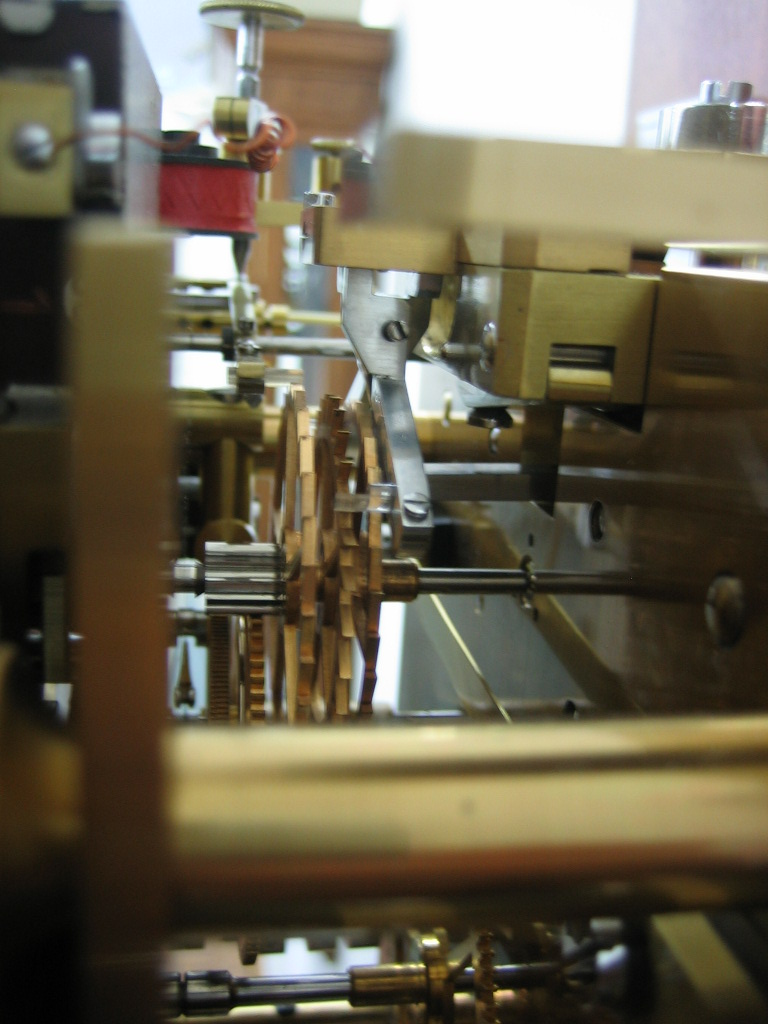
Side view, closeup of double escape wheel of Riefler No.549. This clock has clear synthetic ruby pallets. (Dial on the right side.)

The Riefler escapement is a mechanical escapement for precision pendulum clocks invented and patented by German instrument maker Sigmund Riefler in 1889. It was used in the astronomical regulator clocks made by his German firm Clemens Riefler from 1890 to 1965, which were perhaps the most accurate all-mechanical pendulum clocks made.

An escapement is the mechanism in a mechanical clock that gives the pendulum precise impulses to keep it swinging, and allows the gear train to advance a set amount with each pendulum swing, moving the clock hands forward at a steady rate. The Riefler escapement was an improvement of the deadbeat escapement, the previous standard for precision clocks. In the deadbeat, the force to keep the pendulum swinging is applied by the teeth of the escape wheel sliding alternately against two angled pallets on arms attached to the pendulum. Therefore, slight variations in the friction of the pallets and in the torque from the escape wheel are passed on to the pendulum, disturbing its motion.

== How it works ==
In the Riefler escapement, the energy required to keep the pendulum swinging is instead supplied by bending the short straight spring strip which suspends the pendulum. The upper end of the suspension spring is not attached to a fixed support as in most clocks, but instead is attached to a heavy metal bearer, which pivots on two aligned knife-edges on its underside which rest on flat agate plates. The bending point of the suspension spring is in alignment with the line of contact of the knife-edges. When the pendulum passes its bottom point, the escape wheel is unlocked and pushes the bearer, and the bearer pivots suddenly on its knife edges by a small angle, flexing the spring. The spring is bent by a small amount in addition to that caused by the swing of the pendulum, and thus provides the impulse for the next swing. So the suspension spring is used for two functions: suspending the pendulum and giving it impulse.

The escapement has better performance than the deadbeat because the force from the pallets, with its variability, is applied not to the pendulum but to the bearer. The escapement has no contact with the pendulum below the suspension spring. The pendulum is free of disturbance from the escape wheel for most of each swing and the only work it has to do is to unlock the escape wheel once per second. This operation is performed near the ideal place, at the center of each swing.

The Riefler escape wheel and pallets are of a special design. There are actually two escape wheels mounted on the same shaft and two surfaces on each of the two pallet pins. The front locking wheel has forward pointing teeth rather like a dead-beat escapement, and catches on the flat surface of the pallet to lock the wheel. The rear impulse wheel has teeth with a sloping surface facing the direction of rotation. The round part of each pallet is acted upon by this surface to give the impulse.

== Riefler clocks ==
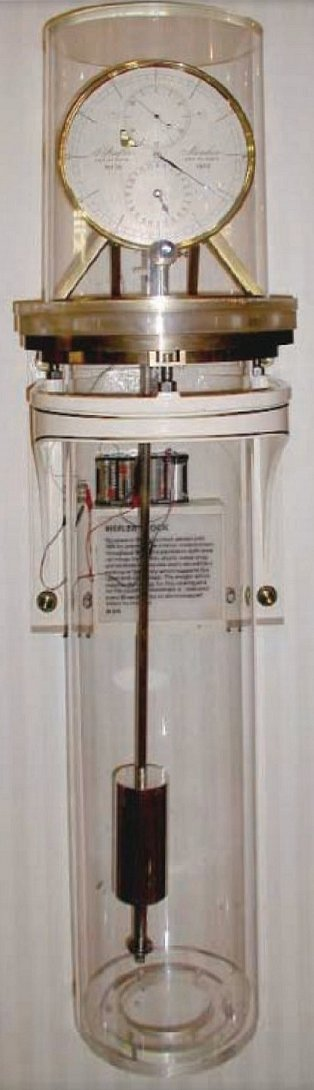
Riefler clock, NIST museum, Gaithersburg, Maryland, USA. 54 inches (134 cm) tall. This clock served as the first US time standard, from 1904 to 1929.

Clemens Riefler precision regulator clocks achieved accuracies of 10 milliseconds per day, and were guaranteed to be within 30 milliseconds. With over 600 made, they were one of the most widely used astronomical regulators, and became the highest standard for timekeeping in the early 20th century. They were used worldwide in astronomical observatories, naval observatories, and as primary standards for electrical time dissemination services, which delivered time signals by telegraph wire. Riefler clocks had internal switch contacts for this purpose, which delivered a 1 Hz time signal to external equipment. The first time standard for the United States, provided by the Bureau of Standards (now NIST), was from 1904 to 1929 generated by Riefler clocks.

In addition to the Riefler escapement, Riefler clocks' mechanism had several other innovations which were responsible for their accuracy. They were one of the first clocks to use a pendulum rod made of the low thermal expansion alloy invar, to prevent the pendulum from changing length with temperature changes, causing error. The most accurate models were mounted in a low pressure tank to eliminate the effect of changes in atmospheric pressure on the pendulum. They were powered by a gravity remontoire, a small weight which was wound up by an electric motor every 30 seconds, to eliminate the effect of changes in drive force on the mechanism.

Working Riefler precision pendulum clocks on display to the public are located at the Deutsches Museum in Munich, the National Watch and Clock Museum in Columbia PA, the Musée international d'horlogerie in La Chaux-de-Fonds and the Musée d'horlogerie in Le Locle (both in Switzerland), the Deutsches Uhrenmuseum in Furtwangen, the US Naval Observatory (by appointment only) in Washington DC, The Clockworks (South London), and in Anderson Hall at Carleton College in Northfield, MN.
