= Shortt–Synchronome clock =

Precision electromechanical pendulum clock

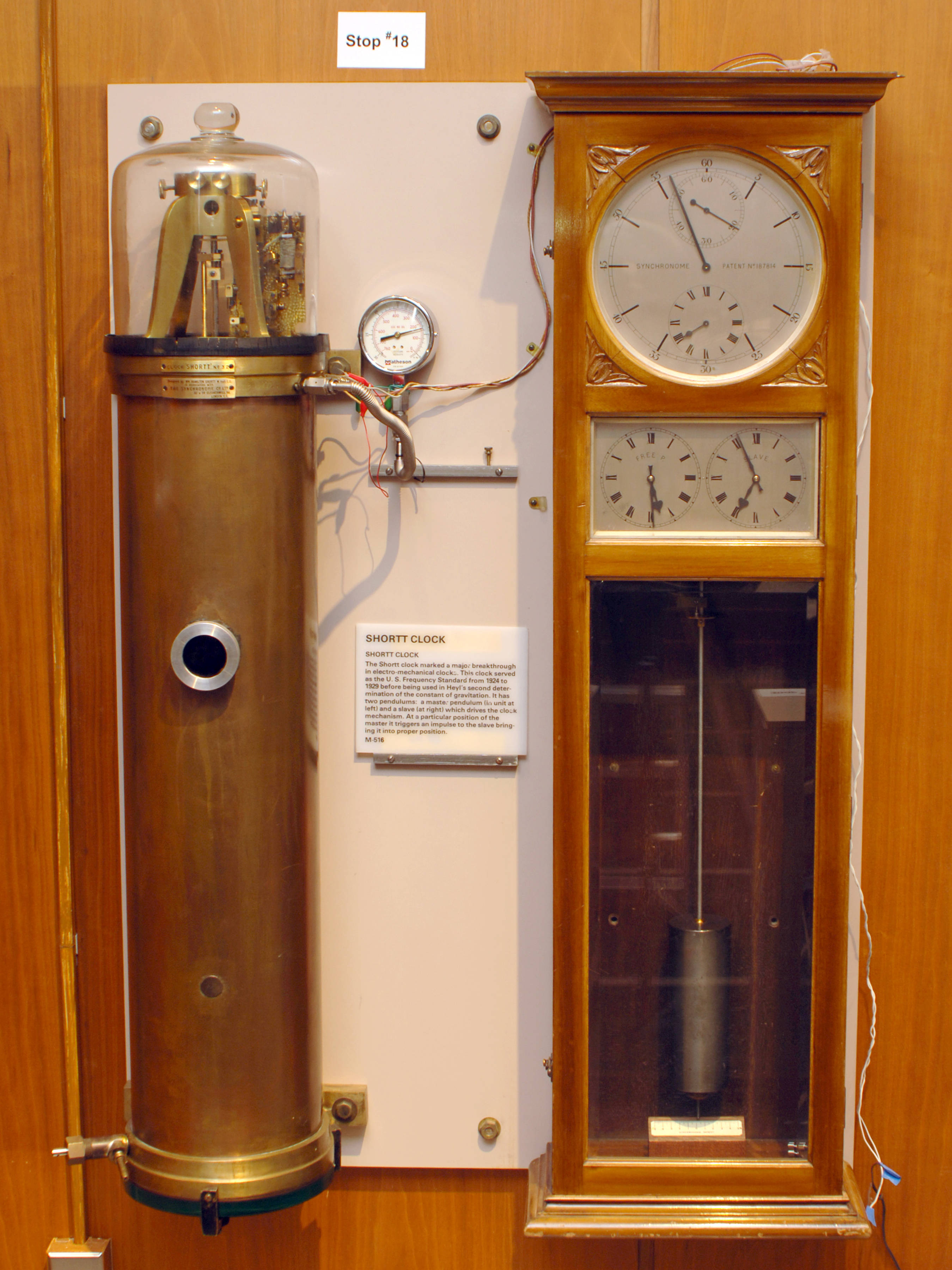
Shortt clock in US National Institute of Standards and Technology museum, Gaithersburg, Maryland. This clock was purchased in 1929 and used in physicist Paul R. Heyl's measurement of the gravitational constant. On the left is the primary pendulum in its vacuum tank.

The Shortt–Synchronome free pendulum clock is a complex precision electromechanical pendulum clock invented in 1921 by British railway engineer William Hamilton Shortt in collaboration with horologist Frank Hope-Jones, and manufactured by the Synchronome Company, Ltd., of London. They were the most accurate pendulum clocks ever commercially produced, and became the highest standard for timekeeping between the 1920s and the 1940s, after which mechanical clocks were superseded by quartz time standards. They were used worldwide in astronomical observatories, naval observatories, in scientific research, and as a primary standard for national time dissemination services. The Shortt was the first clock to be a more accurate timekeeper than the Earth itself; it was used in 1926 to detect tiny seasonal changes in the Earth's rotation rate. Shortt clocks achieved accuracy of around a second per year, although a recent measurement indicated they were even more accurate. About 100 were produced between 1922 and 1956.

Shortt clocks kept time with two pendulums, a primary pendulum swinging in a vacuum tank and a secondary pendulum in a separate clock, which was synchronized to the primary by electro-mechanical means. The secondary pendulum was attached to the timekeeping mechanisms of the clock, leaving the primary pendulum virtually free of external disturbances.

== Description ==
The Shortt clock consists of two separate units: the primary pendulum in a copper vacuum tank 26 cm diameter and 125 cm high attached to a wall, and a precision pendulum clock locked to it, standing a few feet away. To prevent any possibility of coupling between the pendulums, the two units were either installed far apart in different rooms, or the units were oriented so the planes of swing of the two pendulums were ninety degrees apart. The secondary clock was a modified version of a standard Synchronome precision regulator clock. The two components were linked by wires which carried electric pulses that operated electromagnets in the mechanisms to keep the two pendulums swinging in synchronism. The primary pendulum rod and its 14-pound (6.4 kg) weight were made of the alloy invar to reduce thermal expansion and contraction of the pendulum that would otherwise cause the pendulum's period to vary with changes in temperature. The residual thermal expansion rate was compensated to zero with a metal insert under the bob. The vacuum tank was evacuated by a hand-operated pump to a pressure of around 30 mmHg (40 hPa) to prevent changes in atmospheric pressure from affecting the rate of the pendulum, and also to greatly reduce aerodynamic drag on the pendulum, which increased its Q factor from 25,000 to 110,000, thus increasing its accuracy by a factor of four. Experiments by Shortt showed that at 30 mmHg the energy consumed by the flexing of the suspension spring just equalled the energy consumed by deflecting the residual air molecules and therefore a higher vacuum was not required.

Both pendulums were seconds pendulums, about 1 metre (39 in) long, with a period of 2 seconds; each swing of the primary took exactly one second, with the secondary's natural rate very slightly longer. The pendulums received a push from the mechanism once every 30 seconds to keep them swinging. The secondary clock had two clock dials on it, showing the time kept by each pendulum, to verify that they were synchronized. It also had electrical terminals which produced a 1 Hz timing signal. Wires could be attached to these to transmit the clock's ultra-accurate time signal to clocks in other cities, or broadcast it by radio.

== Reason for accuracy ==
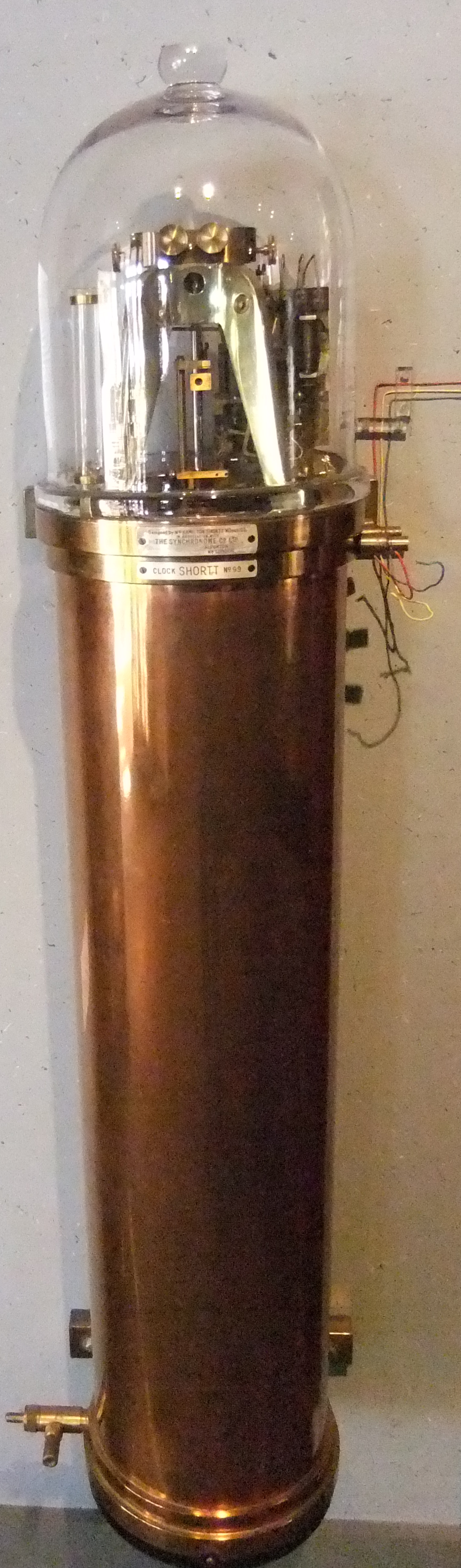
Primary pendulum tank

A pendulum swinging in a vacuum without friction, at a constant amplitude free of external disturbances, theoretically keeps perfect time. However, pendulums in clocks have to be linked to the clock's mechanism, which disturbs their natural swing, and this was the main cause of error in precision clocks of the early 20th century. An ordinary clock's mechanism interacts with the pendulum each swing to perform two functions: first, the pendulum must activate some kind of linkage to record the passage of time. Second, the clock's mechanism, triggered by the linkage, must give the pendulum a push (impulse) to replace the energy the pendulum loses to friction, to keep it swinging. These two functions both disturb the pendulum's motion.

The advantages of the Shortt clock are first, it reduced the disturbance of the primary pendulum due to the impulse by only giving the pendulums an impulse once every 30 seconds exactly (30 pendulum swings), and second, it eliminated all other interaction with the primary pendulum by generating the necessary precise timing signal to control the secondary clock (and record the passage of time) from the impulse mechanism itself, leaving the pendulum to swing "free" of interference.

== How it worked ==
The primary and secondary pendulums were linked together in a feedback loop which kept the secondary synchronized with the primary. The secondary clock had a mechanical escapement using a 15 tooth count wheel which was moved forward each right-hand pendulum swing by a pawl attached to the pendulum.

Every 15 oscillations (30 seconds), this escapement released a gravity lever which gave the secondary pendulum a push. As it fell, the secondary pendulum's gravity lever closed a switch which activated an electromagnet that reset (raised) the secondary pendulum gravity lever and also sent a pulse of current to an electromagnet in the primary unit which released a second gravity lever to give the primary pendulum a push.

The impulse to the primary pendulum was provided by the weight of the primary pendulum's gravity lever (acting as a remontoire) rolling off a wheel attached to the primary pendulum, this mechanism ensuring that the primary pendulum received an identical mechanical impulse every 30 seconds from the primary pendulum gravity lever, at very close to precisely the same part of its stroke.

The falling primary pendulum gravity lever closed a pair of contacts in a second electrical circuit, which reset that lever and provided an electrical pulse back to the hit and miss synchronizer in the secondary unit. Though the beginning of the cycle, commenced by the secondary unit, could vary by a very small amount each thirty seconds, the resetting and synchronizing action (which only took point at the moment the jewel of the primary clock gravity arm assembly rolled off the wheel on the pendulum) was fixed to the position of the primary pendulum and represented the accurate time derived from the "free" (primary) pendulum.

=== Hit and miss synchronizer ===
The pulse from the primary pendulum was used to keep the secondary pendulum in phase with it through a device called a "hit and miss synchronizer".

Every 30 swings, after the primary pendulum was impulsed, the position of the two pendulums was compared. This was done by an electrical pulse from the second circuit, activated by the primary pendulum's gravity lever, which used a second electromagnet in the secondary unit to move a vane into the path of a leaf spring attached to the secondary pendulum. If the secondary pendulum lagged behind the primary, the spring would catch on the vane (called a "hit"). The spring would give the secondary pendulum a push, which shortened the time for that swing. If the secondary pendulum was ahead of the primary pendulum (a "miss") the leaf spring would miss the vane and the secondary pendulum would make its normal swing, without acceleration from the leaf spring.

The secondary pendulum was set to a slightly slower rate than the primary, so the secondary would lag behind the primary more each interval until it received a "hit" which set it ahead again. Typically the acceleration resulting from a "hit" would be adjusted to be about twice the normal loss, so that "hit" and "miss" cycles would roughly alternate, hence the name of the mechanism. This cycle, repeated over and over, kept the secondary precisely in step with the primary over the long term. This feedback loop functioned as an electromechanical version of a phase-locked loop, later used in electronics and quartz and atomic clocks.

== Original cost ==
In 1928, American inventor Alfred Lee Loomis visited the workshop of Frank Hope-Jones and was shown an almost completed 6th clock. After Loomis was told the price was 240 pounds sterling (equivalent to £18,000 in 2024), he shocked Hope-Jones by ordering three clocks and prepaying for the first clock. All three clocks were installed at his Loomis Laboratory in Tuxedo Park, New York.

== Recent accuracy measurement ==
In 1984 Pierre Boucheron studied the accuracy of a working Shortt clock kept on display at the US Naval Observatory. Using modern optical sensors which detected the precise time of passage of the pendulum without disturbing it, he compared its rate to an atomic clock for a month. He found that it was stable to 200 microseconds per day (2.31 ppb), equivalent to an error rate of one second in 12 years, far more accurate than the 1 second per year that was previously measured. His data revealed the clock was so sensitive it was detecting the slight changes in gravity due to tidal distortions in the solid Earth caused by the gravity of the Sun and Moon.

== See also ==
- Master clock
- Pendulum clock
