= Embleton =

Embleton may refer to:

== Places ==
- Embleton, County Durham, England
- Embleton, Cumbria, England
- Embleton, Northumberland, England
- Embleton, Western Australia

== People ==
- Alice Embleton (1876–1960), British zoologist
- Aran Embleton (born 1981), English footballer
- Clifford Embleton (1931–1994), British geomorphologist
- Dennis Embleton (1810–1900), British medical doctor and surgeon
- Edward Embleton (born 1916), English footballer
- Edwin Embleton (1907–2000), British commercial and graphic designer
- Elliot Embleton (born 1999), English footballer
- Gerry Embleton (born 1941), British artist
- Phil Embleton (1948–1974), British racewalker
- Ron Embleton (1930–1988), British painter and illustrator
- Ross Embleton (born 1981), English football coach
- Sheila Embleton (born 1954), Canadian linguist
