= Birkenhead School =

Location
- 58 Beresford Road; Oxton, Merseyside, CH43 2JD; England; 53.3855°N 3.0551°W

Information
- Type: Private day school
- Motto: Beati Mundo Corde (Blessed are the Pure in Heart)
- Religious affiliation: Church of England
- Established: 1860
- Department for Education URN: 105123 Tables
- President: Sir Andreas Whittam Smith CBE
- Chair of Governors: Mark R Cashin
- Headmaster: Paul Vicars
- Chaplain: Bethany Hobbs
- Staff: 250 (approximate)
- Gender: Mixed
- Age: 3 months to 18
- Enrolment: 920 (approximate)
- Houses: Beresford; Bidston; Kingsmead; Shrewsbury
- Colours: Red, black, gold
- Publication: InFocus
- Former pupils: Old Birkonians
- Website: www.birkenheadschool.co.uk

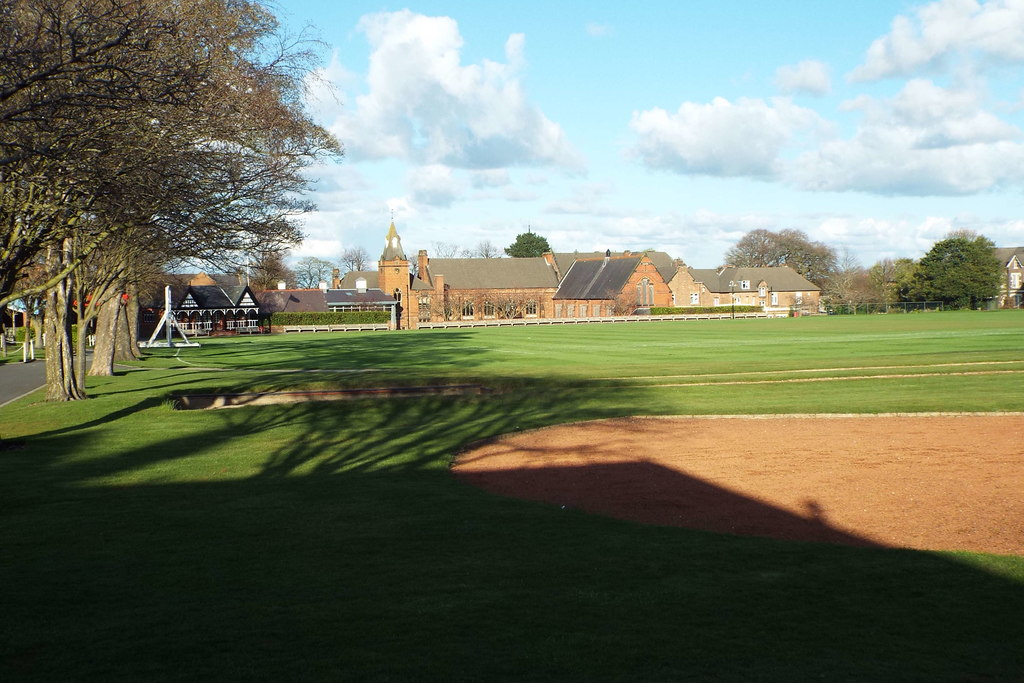
Birkenhead School

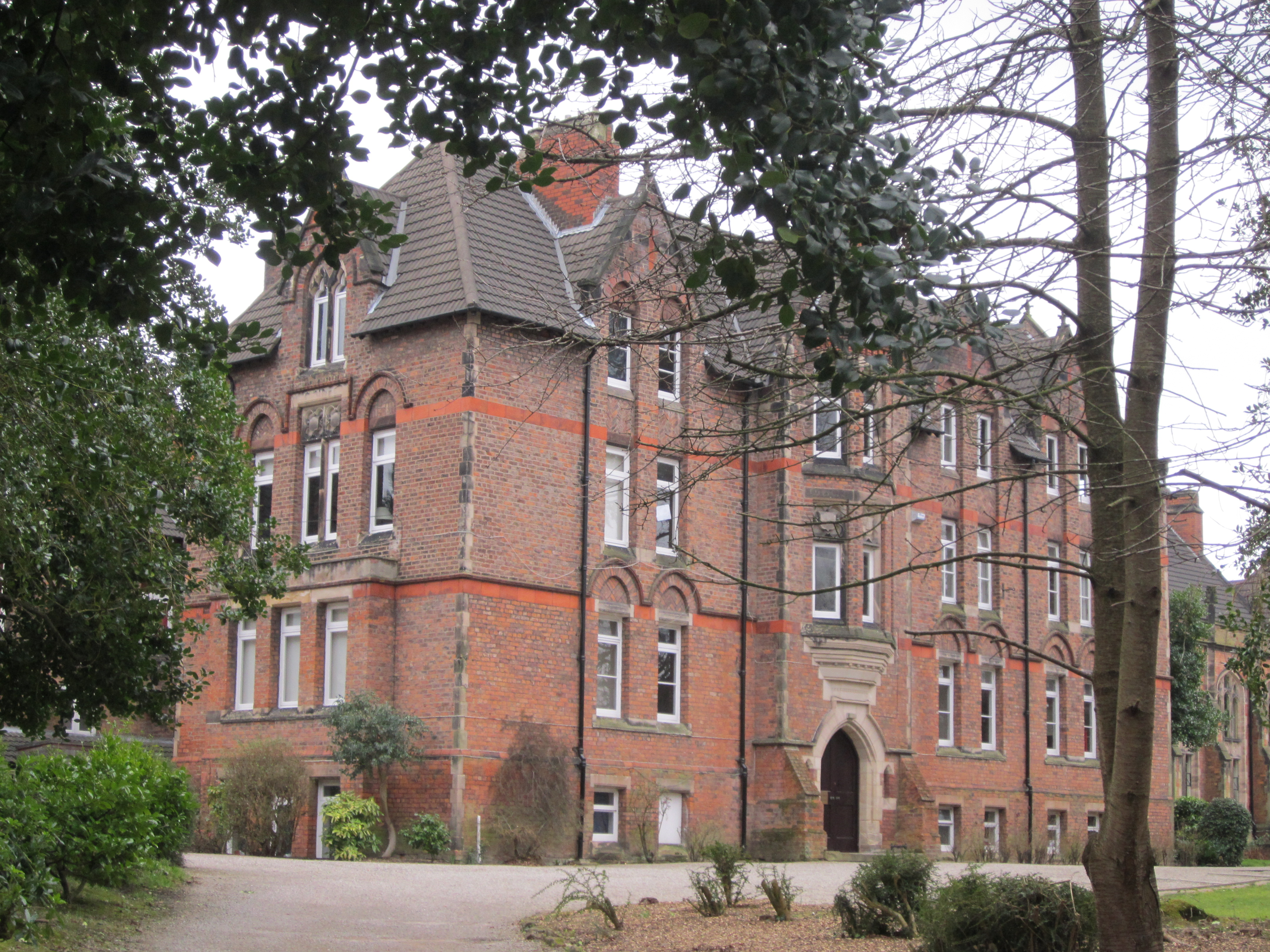
Part of the original school building, now housing the Music School

Birkenhead School is a private, academically-selective, co-educational day school located in Oxton, Wirral, in North West England. The school offers educational opportunities for girls and boys from three years to eighteen years of age.

Birkenhead School is a member of the Headmasters' and Headmistresses' Conference, which is a UK-based association of leading independent schools.

== Overview ==
Birkenhead School comprises:

- Pre-Prep (for children aged 3 to 4 years)
- Prep (Reception to Year 6)
- Seniors (Years 7 to 11)
- Sixth Form (Lower Sixth and Upper Sixth)

Birkenhead School is funded by fees. Bursaries are available to help students take up or retain a place at the school where their parents or guardian cannot pay full fees. Bursaries are means-tested and may cover up to 100% of the full fee. Bursaries typically support between 70 and 80 pupils each year and are overseen by the Birkenhead School Foundation Trust. In addition to bursaries the school offers: Academic and Music Scholarships for entry into Year 6 in recognition of outstanding potential; Honorary Academic Sixth Form Scholarships for outstanding GCSE results; Access Scholarships for those entering the Sixth Form with outstanding GCSE results from other schools who would otherwise not be able to access a Birkenhead School education.

The school is academically-selective from prep onwards.

The current headmaster is Paul Vicars who started in September 2016. Previous headmasters include David Edmunds (2015–16), Jerry Grundy (2014–15), John Clark (2003–2014), Stuart Haggett (1988–2003), John Gwilliam (1963–1988), Kenneth "KD" Robinson (1946–1963) and Warin Foster Bushell (1930–1946).

== Quality of education ==
The last formal inspection by the Independent Schools Inspectorate of the school took place in April 2025. The inspectors found during the three-day inspection an unpadlocked gate, a broken keypad code awaiting repair, and expressed the need for greater supervision of pupils on departure from the site at the end of the school day. As a result the school was cited by The Times School League Tables 2026: as "The biggest faller is Birkenhead School, slipping 407 places to 510th." The report also said "Despite the criticisms in the report, the school was still highly praised. It met standards around education, training, and recreation, safeguarding, as well as their wider education and contribution to society."

== History ==
Birkenhead School was opened in Park Road North, Birkenhead on 9 August 1860 at first called Birkenhead Proprietary School. It started with 18 pupils but had grown to 30 by the end of the first term. By 1870 there were 85 pupils and so a new building was required. The school moved to its present site in Oxton on 2 November 1871. The school's motto was taken from the gospel reading for that day. The Chapel was opened in 1883. The Preparatory Department was established in September 1889 and moved to Beresford Road in 1893. During 1899 the ground alongside Beresford Road was leveled to create the school's playing field.

In 1905 the Noctorum ground, approximately 2.3 hectares (5.5 acres), was rented and subsequently bought in 1910. Buildings on Bidston Road were acquired in 1920 for use as a science block and in 1921 the Lodge in Beresford Road was purchased for the use of the school. The Fender Ground, 9.3 hectares, was acquired in 1922 and part was used by the newly formed Old Birkonian Football Club, prior to moving to an adjacent ground in 1926. Matches were played here until 1976, when the club merged with Birkenhead Park Rugby Club. As playing fields nearer the school were developed, Fender Field was later sold. In 1931, "Junior School" was started in Overdale at the top of Beresford Road.

In 1948 the L.C. McAllester Memorial Ground, 4.7 hectares, was presented to the school. It was officially opened in 1952. A purpose-built science block on Bidston Road was built in 1958, and has since been expanded. In 1982 the Bushell Hall was opened for use by the main school, and the Preparatory School moved into the vacated Shrewsbury Road buildings. These included the original "big school" dating back to 1871, and the recently closed boarding house which at its peak had catered for over forty boarders. The vacated Preparatory School building in Beresford Road was then adapted to provide an extensive Music School, although this has subsequently moved onto the main school campus and the Beresford Road property sold and redeveloped as apartments.

What was the headmaster's house on Shrewsbury Road was acquired in 1988 so that by then the school owned all the properties in the block apart from the Holy Name Church on Beresford Road. In 1992, the Sports Hall was completed. In conjunction with Oxton Sports Club, an all-weather pitch was completed on the McAllester Field site, and also in 1992 the Preparatory Department's purpose built Little School was opened in Kingsmead Road South. In 2001 a climbing wall was added to the Sports Hall. The school opened a Nursery in 2006, catering for children from 3 months upwards. Building work to support the co-educational future of the school, including additional classrooms on Shrewsbury Road and an extension to the Sports Pavilion at McAllester Field to provide female changing facilities, was completed in 2009. In 2011 the redeveloped Sixth Form Centre on Bidston Road opened.

In 2000 the sixth form became co-educational. This was followed by the Pre-Prep Department (kindergarten) in 2006. Partly in response to the decision of Birkenhead High School to become a non-selective city academy, Birkenhead School became wholly co-educational in 2008 and girls currently make up around 45% of the school (38% of Prep). In 2010 the first female chaplain was appointed and in 2015 the first female head of school, Eleanor Hilton, was appointed.

The school had a Combined Cadet Force (CCF) contingent from October 1914. To the initial Army section, Royal Air Force and Royal Navy sections were added in 1949 and 1950, respectively. Membership was compulsory until 2006 for pupils of the fourth form onwards, but it then became an entirely voluntary after-school activity until 2015 when declining numbers caused its disbandment. The CCF was then replaced by a variety of adventurous activities for the pupils.

In 1935 Birkenhead School became a Direct Grant school. Under this scheme it received a subsidy from the local education authority allowing fees to be based on the ability to pay, with some places being free. The Direct Grant scheme began to be phased out in 1976 and so the school became private. An Assisted Places Scheme was introduced in 1980 but this was abolished in 1997. Bursaries and assisted places are overseen by the Birkenhead School Foundation Trust.

Plans were published in 2020 to sell Noctorum Field to provide enhanced sports facilities on the campus, to assist two local rugby clubs and to fund additional bursaries. The plans were rejected by the Planning committee of Wirral Borough Council and were referred to the Planning Inspectorate for a final decision. In August 2024 these plans were once again "thrown out" by the Planning Inspectorate, who again sided with the local council as they made their judgement.

== Notable Old Birkonians ==
- Charles Harrison Townsend (1851–1928), architect
- Cecil Reddie (1858–1932), Founder and Headmaster of Abbotsholme School, 1889–1927
- Robert Hope-Jones (1859–1914), inventor of the theatre organ
- Leonard Leslie Brooke (1862–1940), children's writer and illustrator
- Frank Hope-Jones (1867–1950), horologist and creator of the Greenwich Time Signal pips
- Wynfrid Duckworth (1870–1956), anatomist, and Master of Jesus College, Cambridge, 1940–1945
- F. E. Smith, 1st Earl of Birkenhead (1872–1930), barrister, Attorney-General, 1916–1919, Lord Chancellor, 1919–1922, and Secretary of State for India, 1924–1928
- Douglas Laurie (1874–1953), Professor of Zoology, University College of Wales, Aberystwyth, 1922–1940, and Founding Honorary General Secretary, Association of University Teachers, 1919–1953
- Sir Harold Smith KC (1876–1924), Conservative politician
- Edgar Downs (1876–1963), artist
- Russell Darbyshire, (1880–1948), Anglican archbishop
- Henry Graham White (1880–1965); Liberal politician
- Lieutenant-General Sir Wilfrid Lindsell (1884–1973), Quartermaster-General, British Expeditionary Force, 1939–1940, Lieutenant-General i/c Administration, Middle East, 1942–1943, and Principal Administration Officer, Fourteenth Army, 1943–1945
- Sir Melvill Jones (1887–1975), Francis Mond Professor of Aeronautical Engineering, University of Cambridge, 1919–1952
- Arthur Willmer (1890–1916), first-class cricketer
- Martin Percival Charlesworth (1895–1950), classicist
- Geoffrey Webb (1898–1970), Slade Professor of Fine Art, University of Cambridge, 1938–1949, and Secretary, Royal Commission on Historical Monuments (England), 1948–1962
- Sir Gordon Willmer (1899–1983), Lord Justice of Appeal
- Andrew Irvine (1902–1924), mountaineer who attempted the summit of Mount Everest with George Mallory
- Nevill Willmer (1902–2001), Professor of Histology, University of Cambridge, 1966–1969
- Brigadier Sir Philip Toosey (1904–1975), merchant banker, Territorial Army officer, and senior Allied officer during the building of the Bridge on the River Kwai
- John Rogers (1910–1968), first-class cricketer
- Commodore William Warwick CBE (1912–1999), Master Mariner, first Master of the QE2
- Peter Shepheard (1913–2002), architect
- Henry Pelling (1920–1997), historian
- Air Chief Marshal Sir John Aiken (1921–2005), Director of Training, Royal Air Force, 1971–1973, and Commander, British Forces in Cyprus, 1973–1976
- Eric Cockeram (1924–2021), former MP
- Gruffydd Evans, Baron Evans of Claughton (1928–1992), lawyer and politician
- Clifford Embleton (1931–1994), Professor of Geography, King's College London, 1982–1994
- William Wade, Baron Wade of Chorlton (1932–2018), businessman, and Joint Treasurer of the Conservative Party, 1982–1990
- Donald Nicholls, Baron Nicholls of Birkenhead (1933–2019), Vice-Chancellor, High Court of Justice, 1991–1994, and Lord of Appeal in Ordinary, 1994–2007
- Trevor Thomas (1934–2020), historian
- Don Webb (1934–2024), playwright and scriptwriter
- Andreas Whittam Smith (1937–2025), journalist and co-founder of The Independent
- Barry Porter (1939–1996), Conservative politician
- Graham Richards (born 1939) Head of Chemistry (1997–2006) at the University of Oxford.
- Timothy Mason (1940–1990), historian
- Christopher Morris (born 1940), pop singer known as Lance Fortune
- Michael F. Land (1942–2020), Professor of Neurobiology, University of Sussex
- Crispin Wright (born 1942), philosopher
- Michael Gray, (born 1946), author and Bob Dylan critic
- Howard Skempton (born 1947), composer
- Nick Pollard (born 1950), journalist
- Stephen Smith, (born 1951), academic and health executive
- Peter Ramsden (born 1951), Anglican bishop in Papua New Guinea
- Tony Hall, Baron Hall of Birkenhead (born 1951), former Director-General of the BBC and former Chief Executive, Royal Opera House, Covent Garden
- Alan Rouse (1951–1986), mountaineer, and first Briton to reach the summit of K2
- Donald Allister (born 1952), Bishop of Peterborough
- Sir Graham Vick (1953–2021), opera director
- Philip Andrew Jones (born 1960), Royal Navy Officer, British Admiral, First Sea Lord
- Kevin Sampson (born 1961), novelist
- Karl McCartney (born 1968), former MP
- Douglas Robb (born 1970), headmaster of Gresham's School

== Notable masters ==
- Warin Foster Bushell
- John Gwilliam
- Ewan Anderson
- Edward O'Hara
- Henry Smoker

== Arms ==
Coat of arms of Birkenhead School
Notes Granted on 4 March 1959. Crest On a wreath Or and Gules, a coronet composed of eight silver-birch leaves set upon a rim Vert. Escutcheon Quarterly Gules and Or, in the first quarter a lion passant argent, over all a crosier erect, crook to the sinister, surmounted by an open book also Argent, the pages inscribed with the words BEATI MVNDO CORDE in letters Sable. Motto 'Beati Mundo Corde'

== See also ==
- Listed buildings in Oxton, Merseyside
