= Horniman Museum =

Museum in Forest Hill, London, England

Coordinates: 51°26′26″N 0°03′39″W

Horniman Museum and Gardens
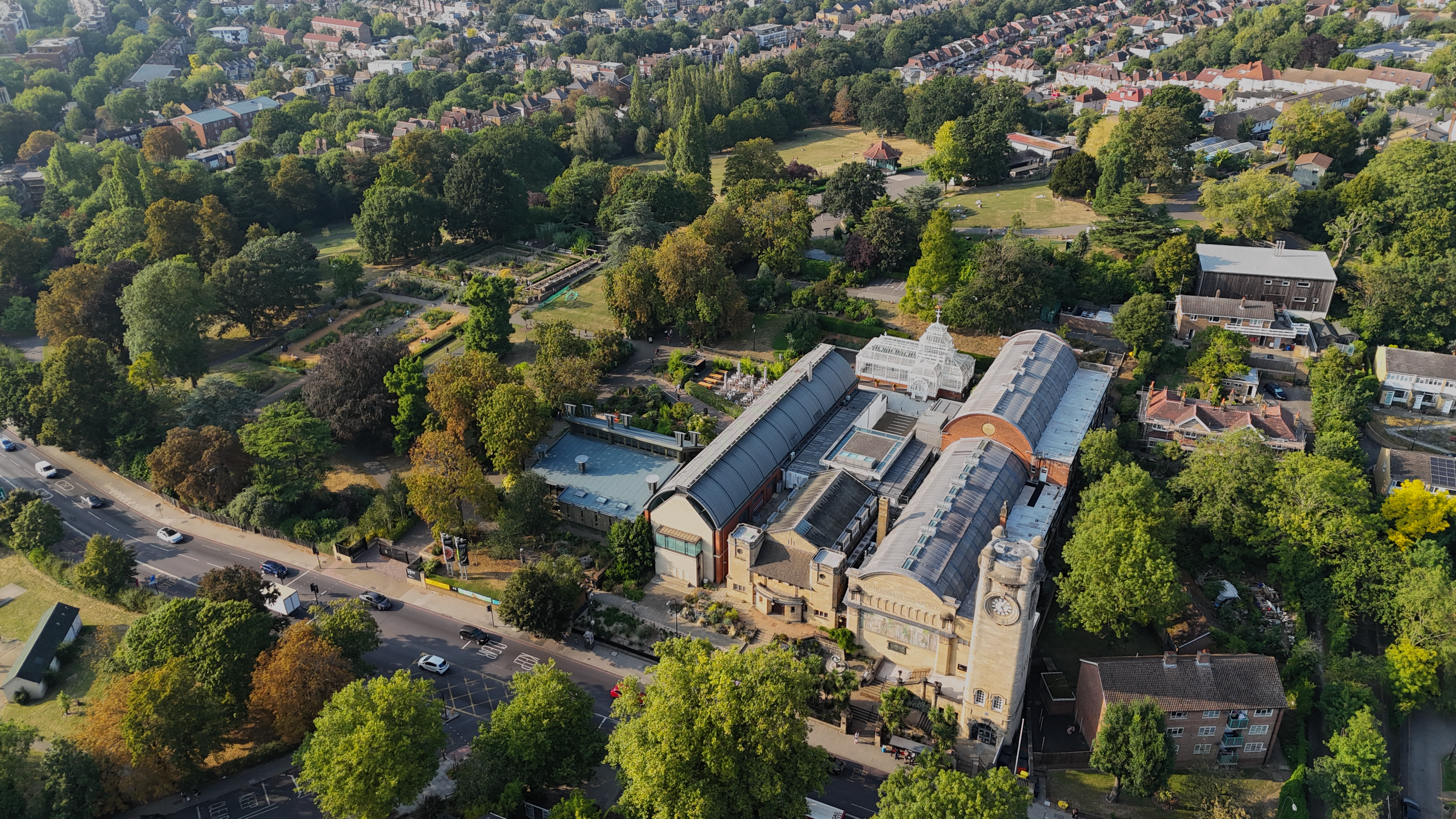
- The Horniman Museum and Gardens viewed from the air to the south

- Location within London Borough of Lewisham
- Established: 1901; 125 years ago
- Location: 100 London Road, Forest Hill; London, SE23 3PQ; United Kingdom
- Visitors: 830,699 (2025)
- Public transit access: Forest Hill; 176, 185, 197, 356, P4
- Website: horniman.ac.uk

Listed Building – Grade II*
- Official name: Horniman Museum
- Designated: 12 March 1973
- Reference no.: 1079996

The Horniman Museum and Gardens is a museum in Forest Hill, London, England. Commissioned in 1898, it opened in 1901 and was designed by Charles Harrison Townsend in the Modern Style. It has displays of anthropology, natural history and musical instruments, and is known for its large collection of taxidermied animals. The building is Grade II* listed.

It is a non-departmental public body of the Department for Culture, Media and Sport and is constituted as a company and registered charity under English law. In 2022 the museum won Museum of the Year, an award made by the Art Fund.

== History ==
The museum was founded in 1901 by Frederick John Horniman. Frederick had inherited his father's Horniman's Tea business, which by 1891 had become the world's biggest tea trading business.

The proceeds from the business allowed Horniman to indulge his lifelong passion for collecting, and which after travelling extensively had some 30,000 items in his various collections, covering natural history, cultural artefacts and musical instruments.

In 1911, an additional building to the west of the main building, originally containing a lecture hall and library, was donated by Frederick Horniman's son Emslie Horniman. This was also designed by Townsend. A new extension, opened in 2002, was designed by Allies and Morrison.

In 2007, the museum held the Walking with Beasts Exhibition. The exhibition featured life-sized models of extinct animals featured in the BBC series of the same name, such as Smilodon and the Woolly Mammoth.

The museum won the Art Fund's Museum of the Year award in 2022. In November 2022, the museum returned a collection of 72 items that were stolen from the Kingdom of Benin, including Benin Bronzes, to Nigeria's National Commission for Museums and Monuments.

== Collections ==
The Horniman specialises in anthropology, natural history and musical instruments and has a collection of 350,000 objects. The ethnography and music collections have Designated status. One of its most famous exhibits is the large collection of stuffed animals. It also has an aquarium noted for its unique layout.

== Floor directory ==
1st Floor	Ground Floor	Lower Ground Floor	Basement Floor Access by stairs and lift
Under 5s Book Zone; Natural History Balcony Horniman Highlight Objects; 3 Apostle Clock, Germany	Main Entrance; CUE Building; Conservatory; Café; Shop; Education Centre; Hands On Base; Natural History Gallery; Balcony Gallery; Environment Room Horniman Highlight Objects; 1 Sand Painting, America; 2 Walrus, Canada	World Gallery Temporary Exhibition Gallery; Music Gallery; Gallery Square; Security Reception from London Road One Gallery closed for redevelopment Horniman Highlight Objects; 4 French Horn, England; 5 Carlton Drum Kit, England; 6 Torture Chair, Unknown; 7 Kali with Shiva Figure, India; 8 Benin Plaques, Nigeria	Aquarium

== Transport connections ==
Service	Station/Stop	Lines/Routes served	Distance from Horniman Museum
London Buses	Horniman Museum	176, 185, 197, 356, P4	
London Buses	Horniman Park	363	260 m (850 ft) walk
London Overground	Forest Hill	Windrush line	650 m (2,130 ft) walk
National Rail	Forest Hill	Southern	650 m (2,130 ft) walk

== Gardens ==
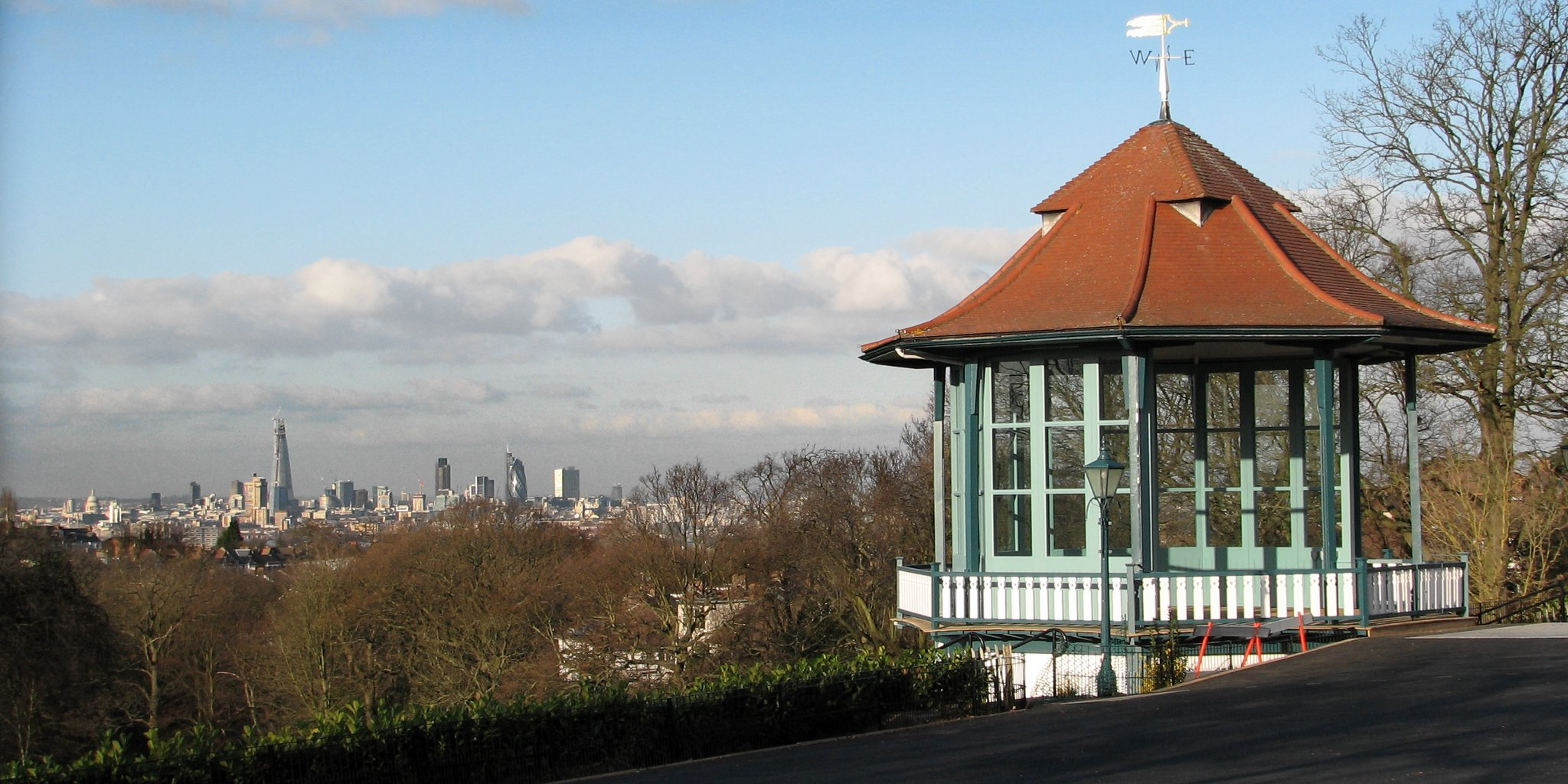
The bandstand overlooking the London skyline

The museum is set in 16 acres (65,000 m^{2}) of gardens, which include the following features:

- A Grade II listed conservatory from 1894 which was moved from Hornimans' family house in Croydon to the present site in the 1980s.
- A bandstand from 1912
- An enclosure for small animals
- A Butterfly House
- A nature trail
- An ornamental garden
- Plants for materials, medicines, and foods and dyes
- A sound garden with large musical instruments for playing
- A new building, the Pavilion, for working on materials that are outside of the collections, such as from the gardens.

The gardens are also Grade II listed on the Register of Historic Parks and Gardens of Special Historic Interest in England.

=== Mosaic ===
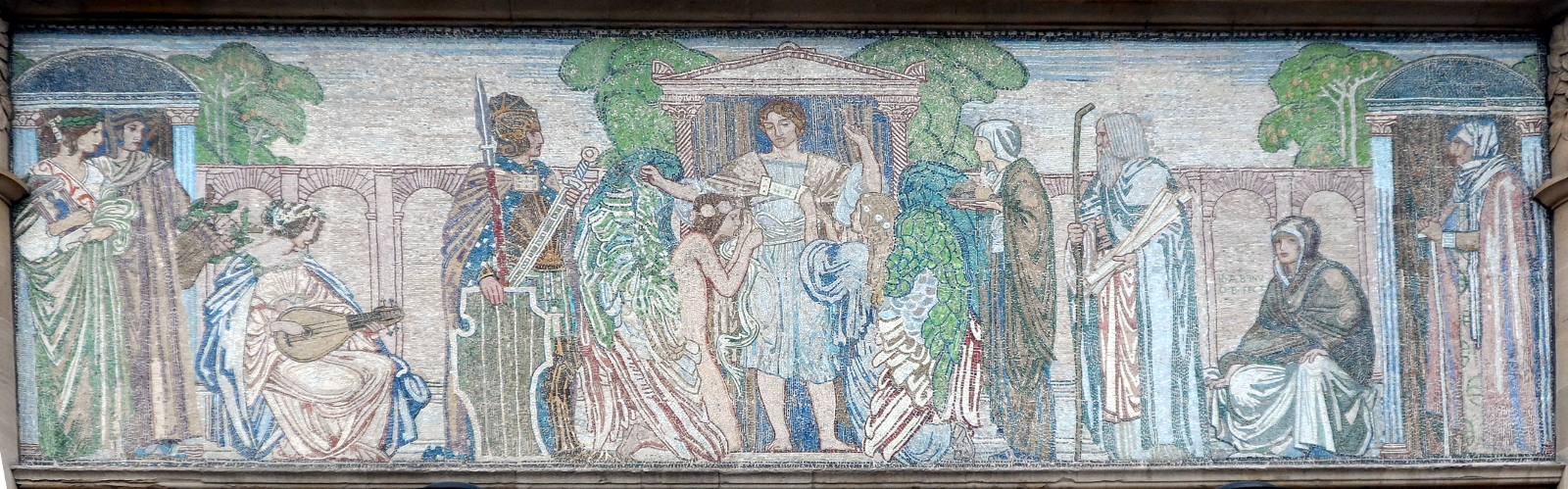
Humanity in the House of Circumstance

On the London Road wall of the main building is a neoclassical mosaic mural entitled Humanity in the House of Circumstance, designed by Robert Anning Bell and assembled by a group of young women over the course of 210 days. Composed of more than 117,000 individual tesserae, it measures 10 ft × 32 ft (3.0 m × 9.8 m) and symbolises personal aspirations and limitations.

The three figures on the far left represent Art, Poetry and Music, standing by a doorway symbolising birth, while the armed figure represents Endurance. The two kneeling figures represent Love and Hope, while the central figure symbolises Humanity. Charity stands to the right bearing figs and wine, followed by white-haired Wisdom holding a staff, and a seated figure representing Meditation. Finally, a figure symbolising Resignation stands by the right-hand doorway, which represents death.

=== Totem pole ===
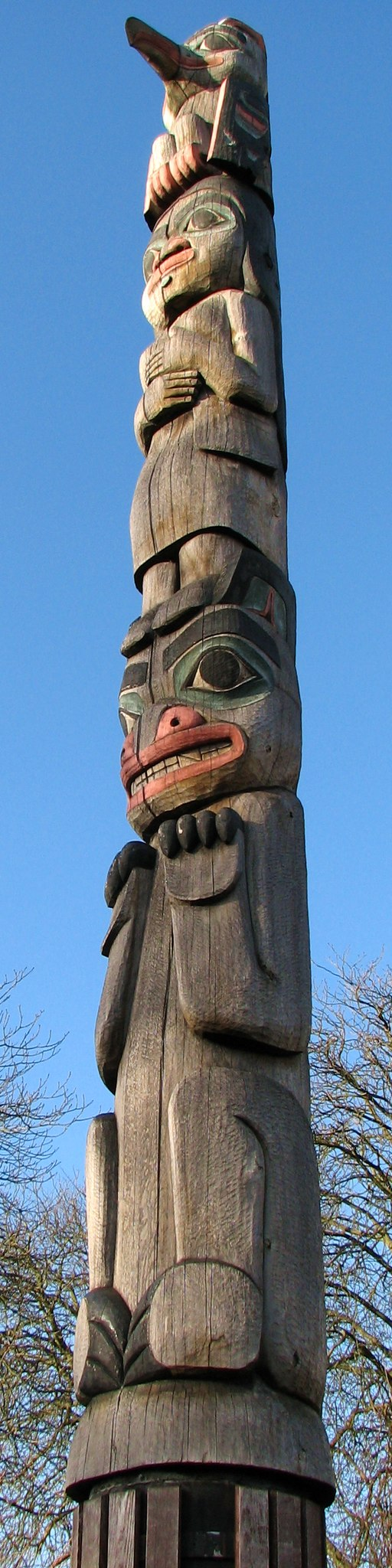
The totem pole

A 20 ft (6.1 m) totem pole, carved from red cedar, stands outside the museum's main entrance. It was carved in 1985 as part of the American Arts Festival by Nathan Jackson, a Tlingit native Alaskan. The carvings on the pole depict figures from Alaskan legend of a girl who married a bear, with an eagle (Jackson's clan crest) at the top. The pole is one of only a handful of totem poles in the United Kingdom, others being on display at the British Museum, the National Museum of Scotland in Edinburgh, Windsor Great Park, Bushy Park, the Yorkshire Sculpture Park, the Pitt Rivers Museum at Oxford, and at Alsford's Wharf in Berkhamsted. There is also a totem pole in the Royal Albert Memorial Museum in Exeter. It is displayed in their World Cultures galleries.

=== CUE building ===
The Horniman Museum contains the CUE (Centre for Understanding the Environment) building. This opened in 1996 and was designed by local architects Archetype using methods developed by Walter Segal. The building has a grass roof and was constructed from sustainable materials. It also incorporates passive ventilation.

== Gallery ==
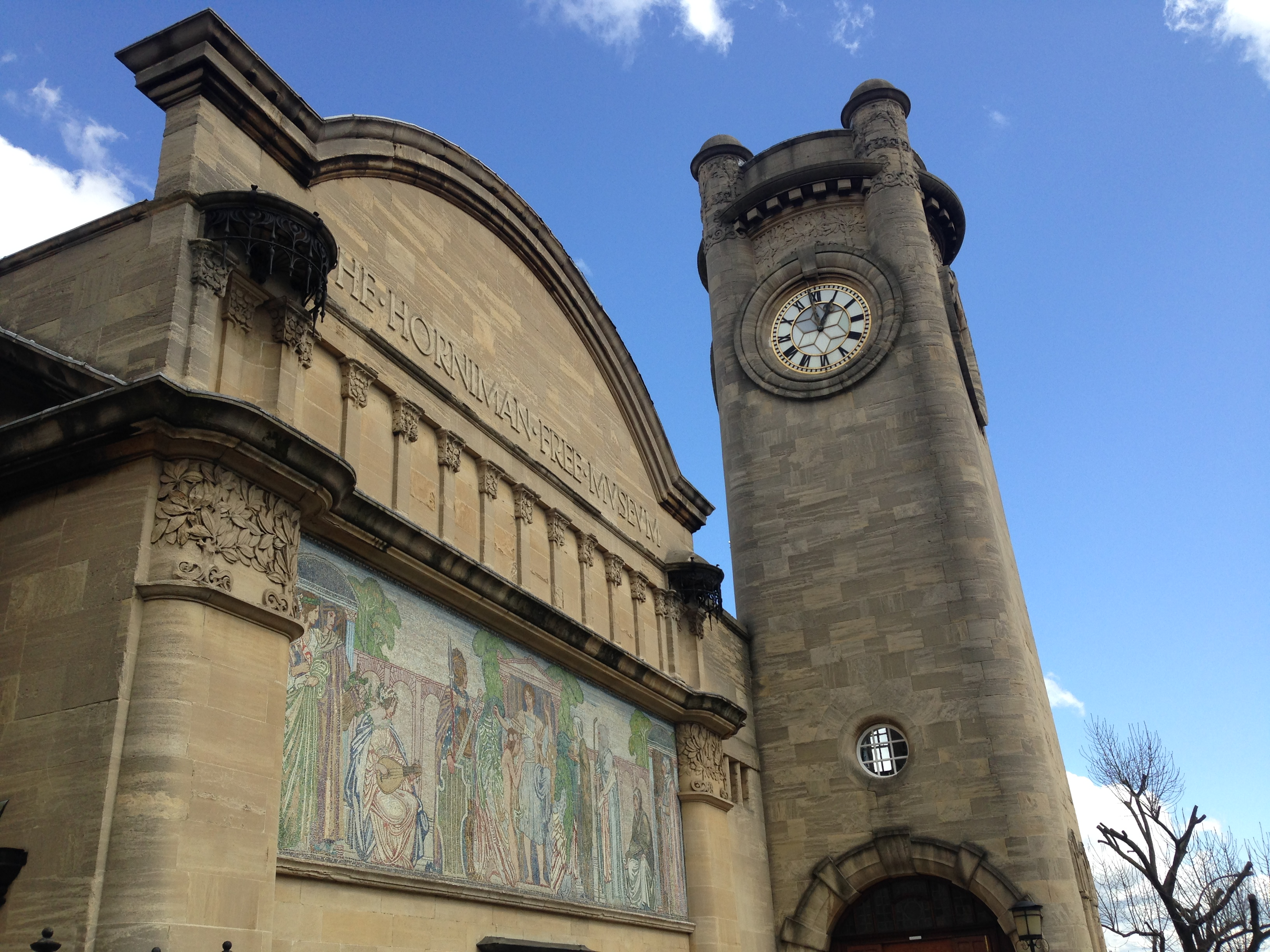
Museum front and tower

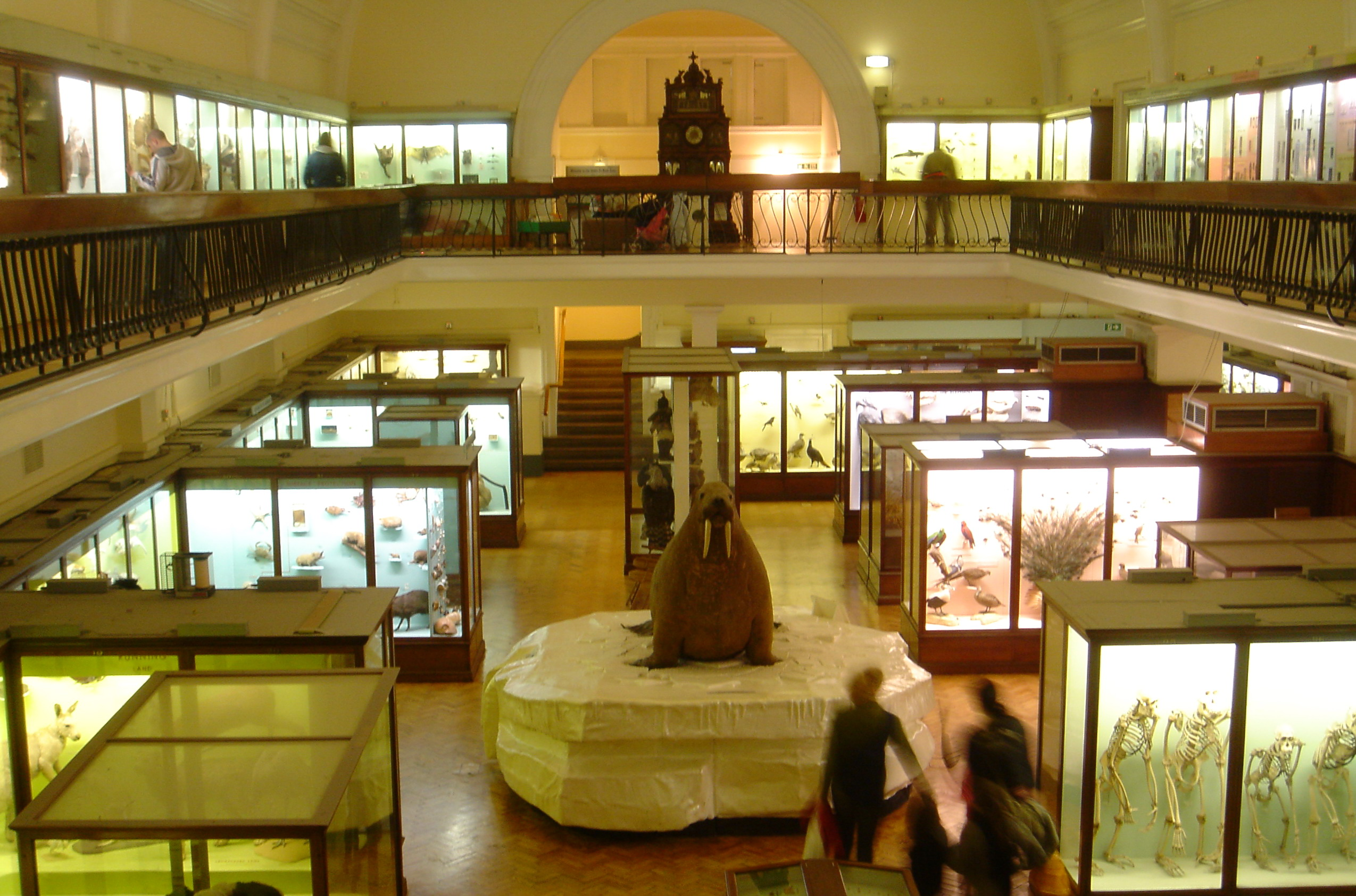
Museum main gallery

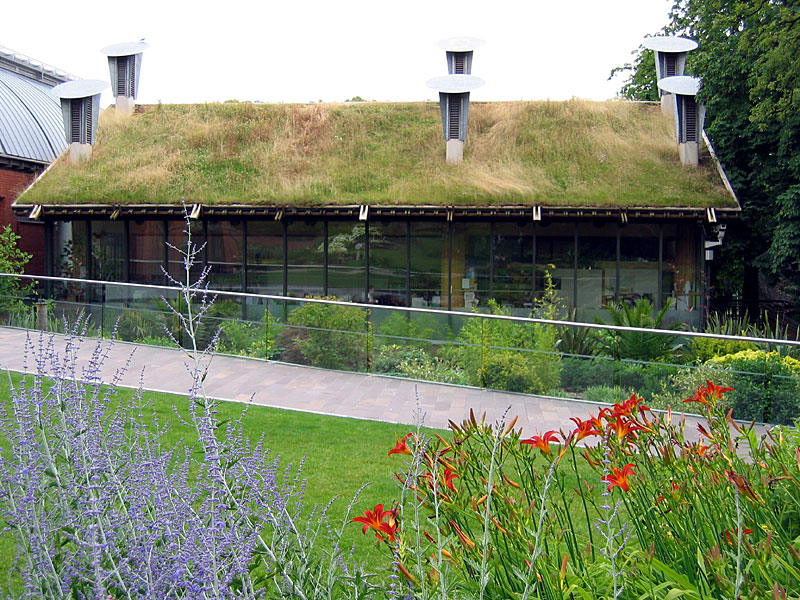
The CUE Building

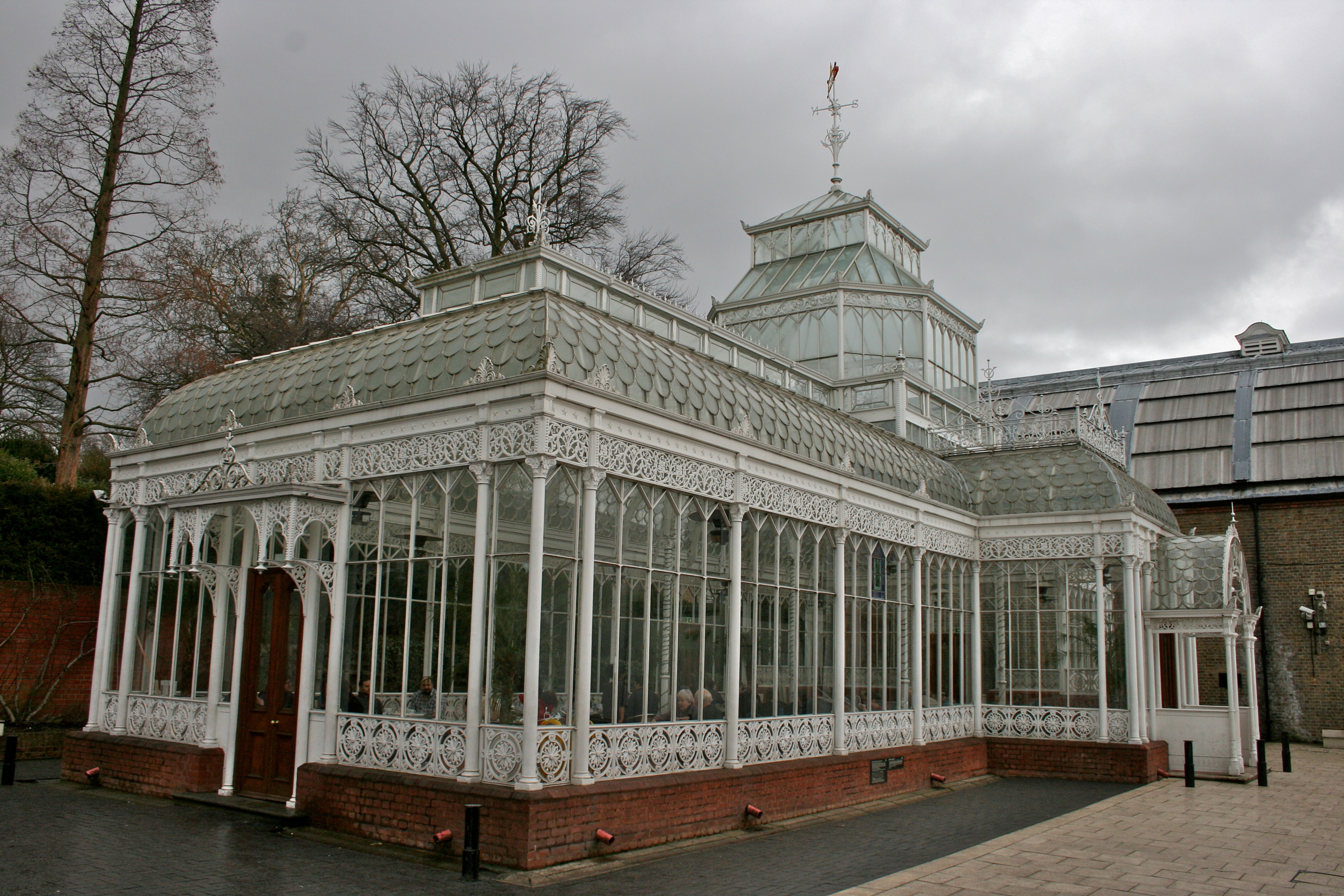
The exterior of the conservatory

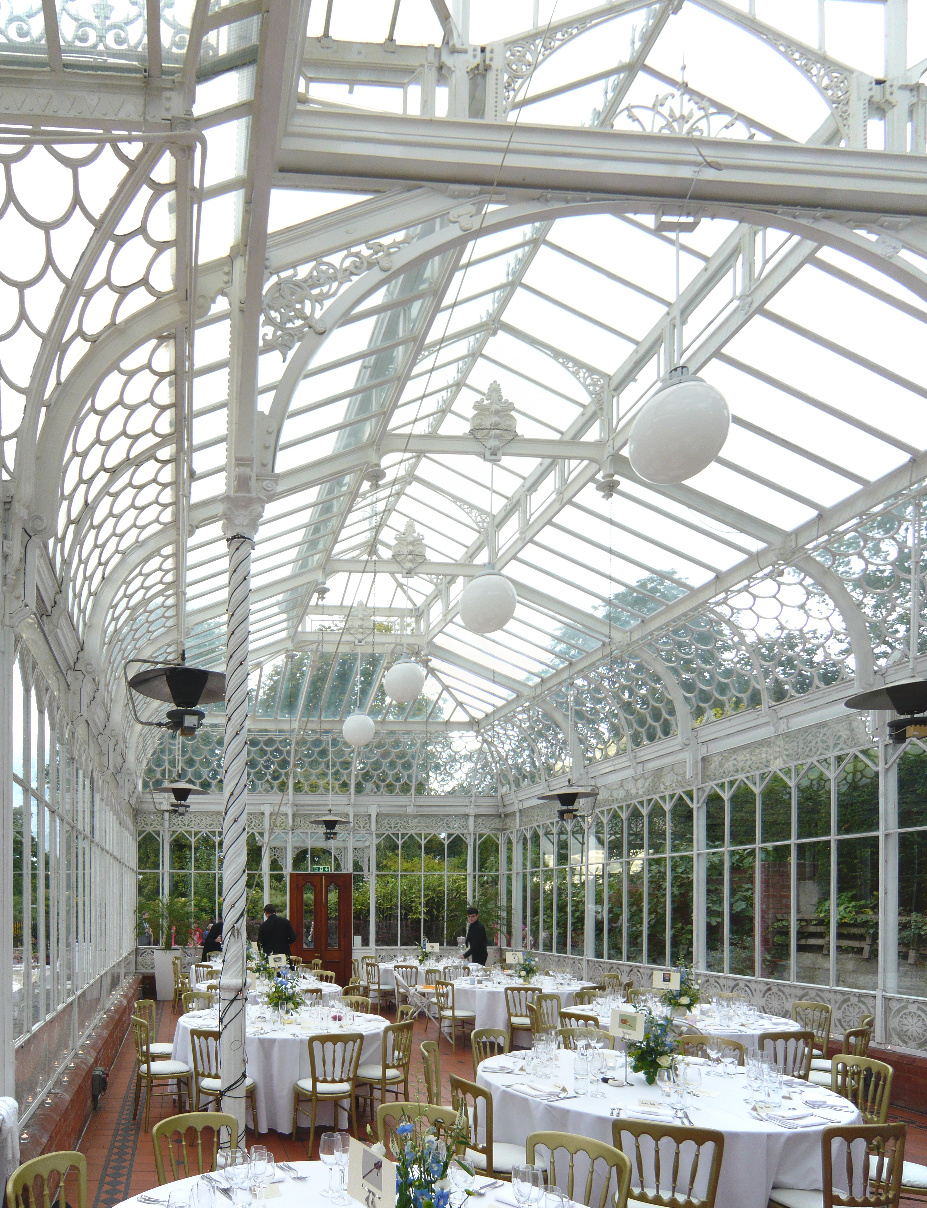
The interior of the conservatory

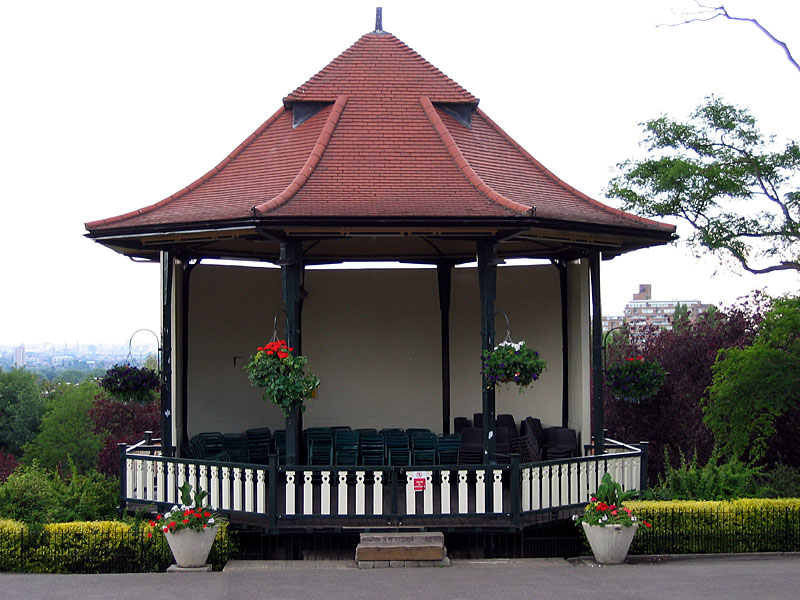
The bandstand from 1912

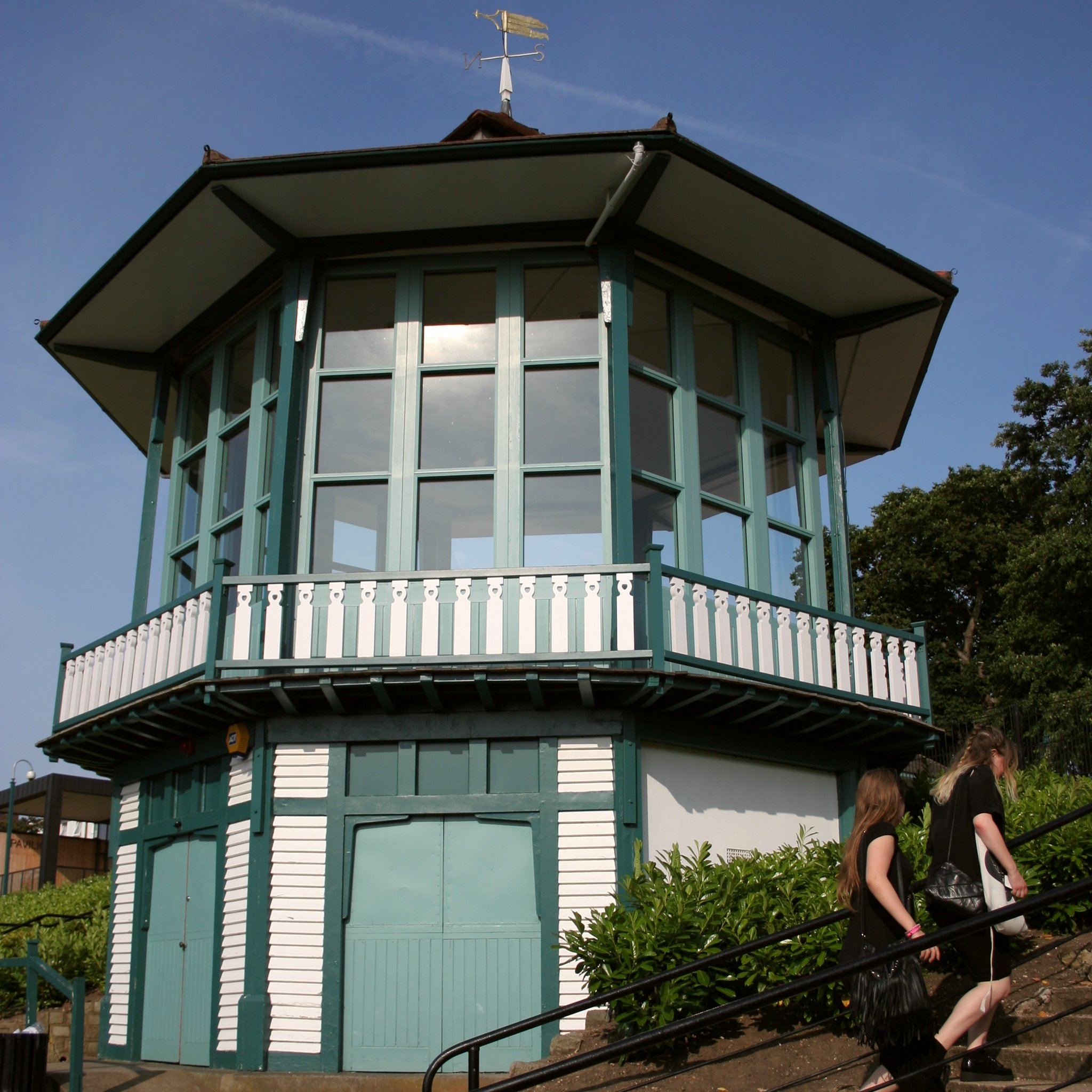
The bandstand viewed from below in July 2013

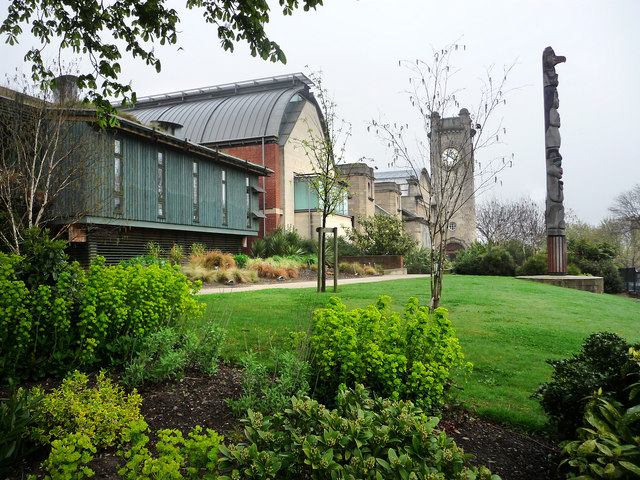
The Horniman totem pole

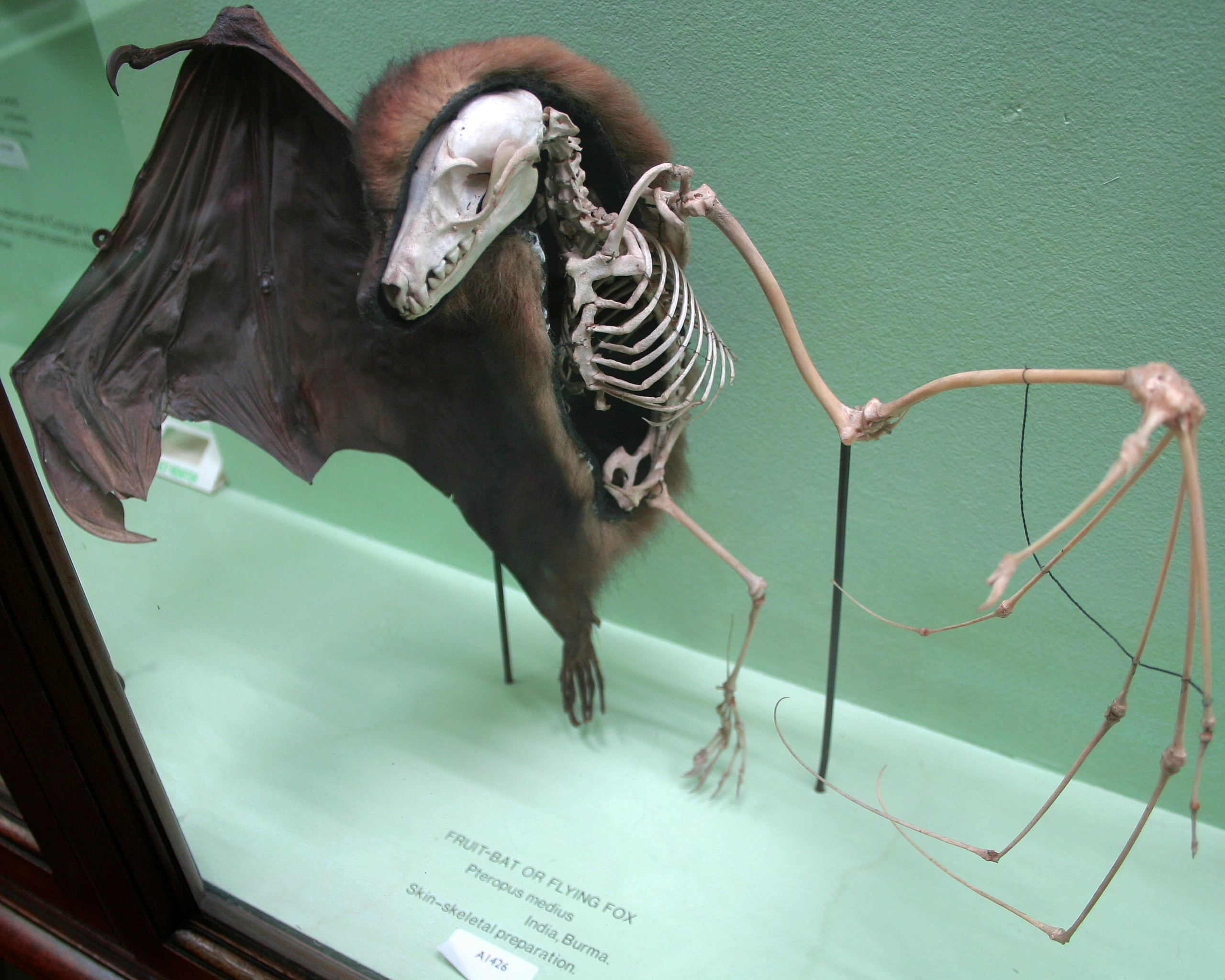
A preserved fruit bat showing how the skeleton fits inside its skin

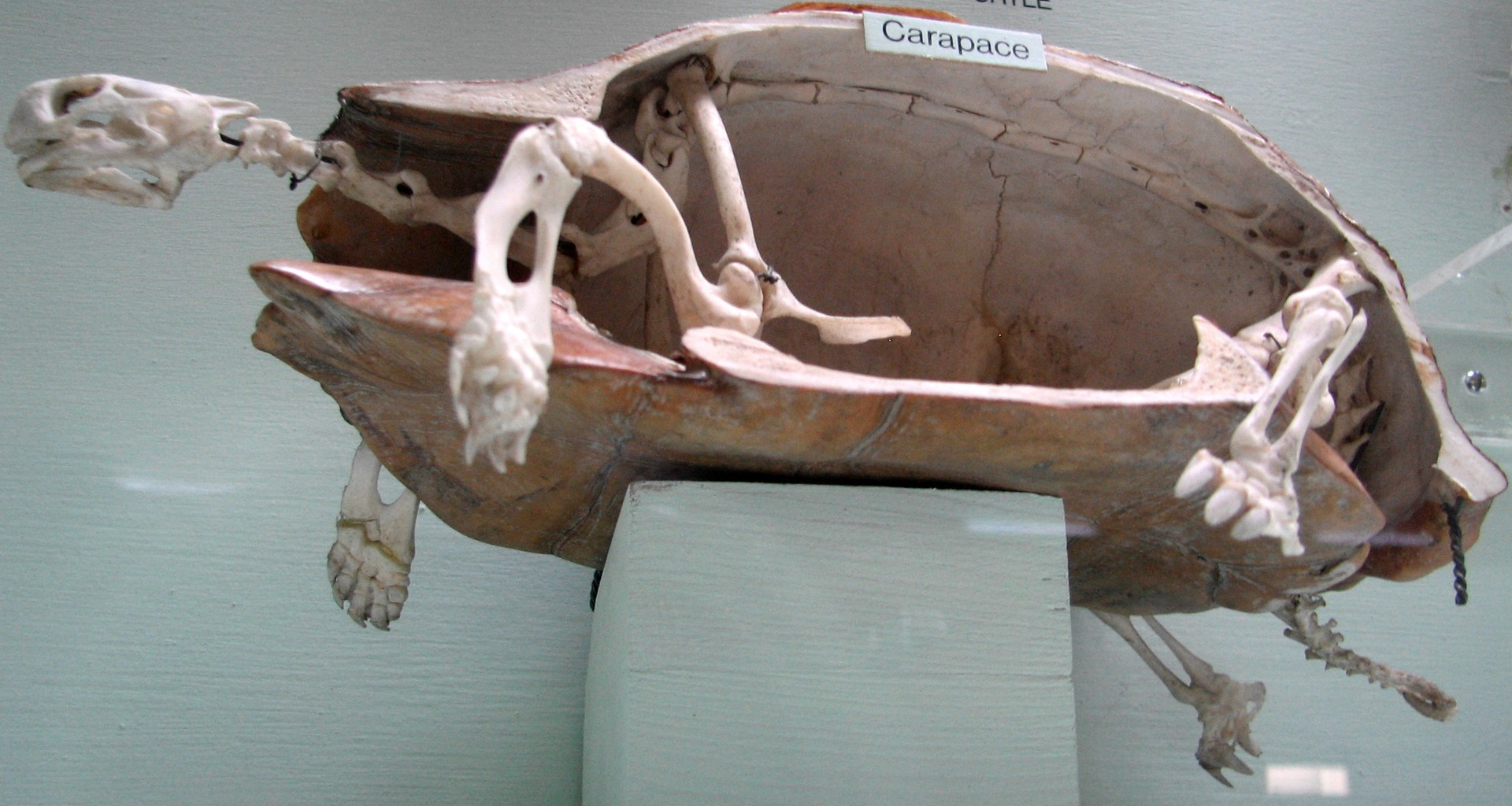
A preserved turtle skeleton showing how the carapace connects with the rest of the skeleton

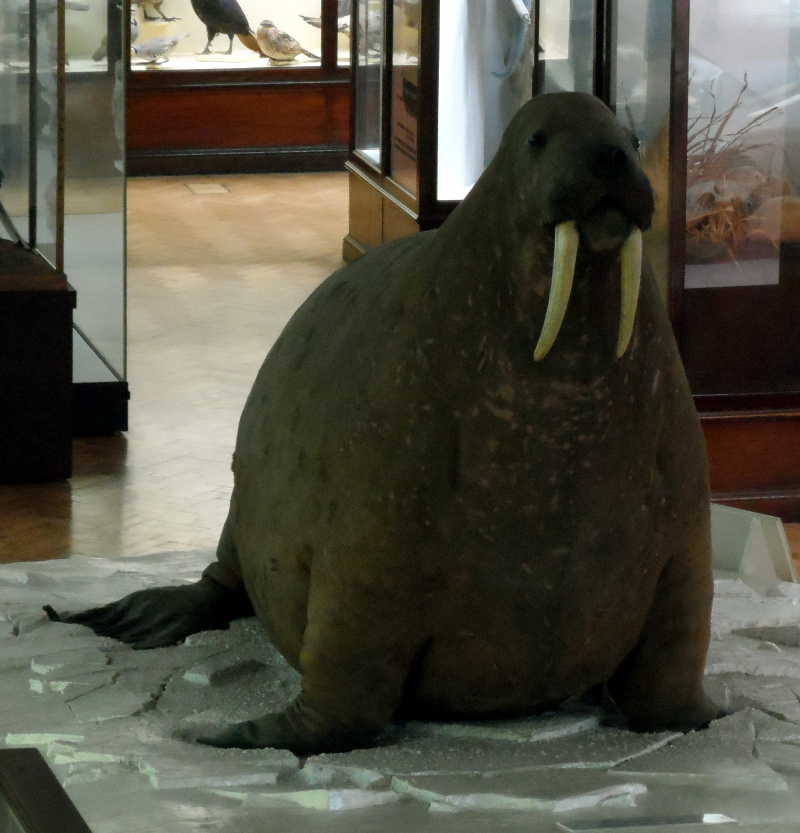
Canadian walrus

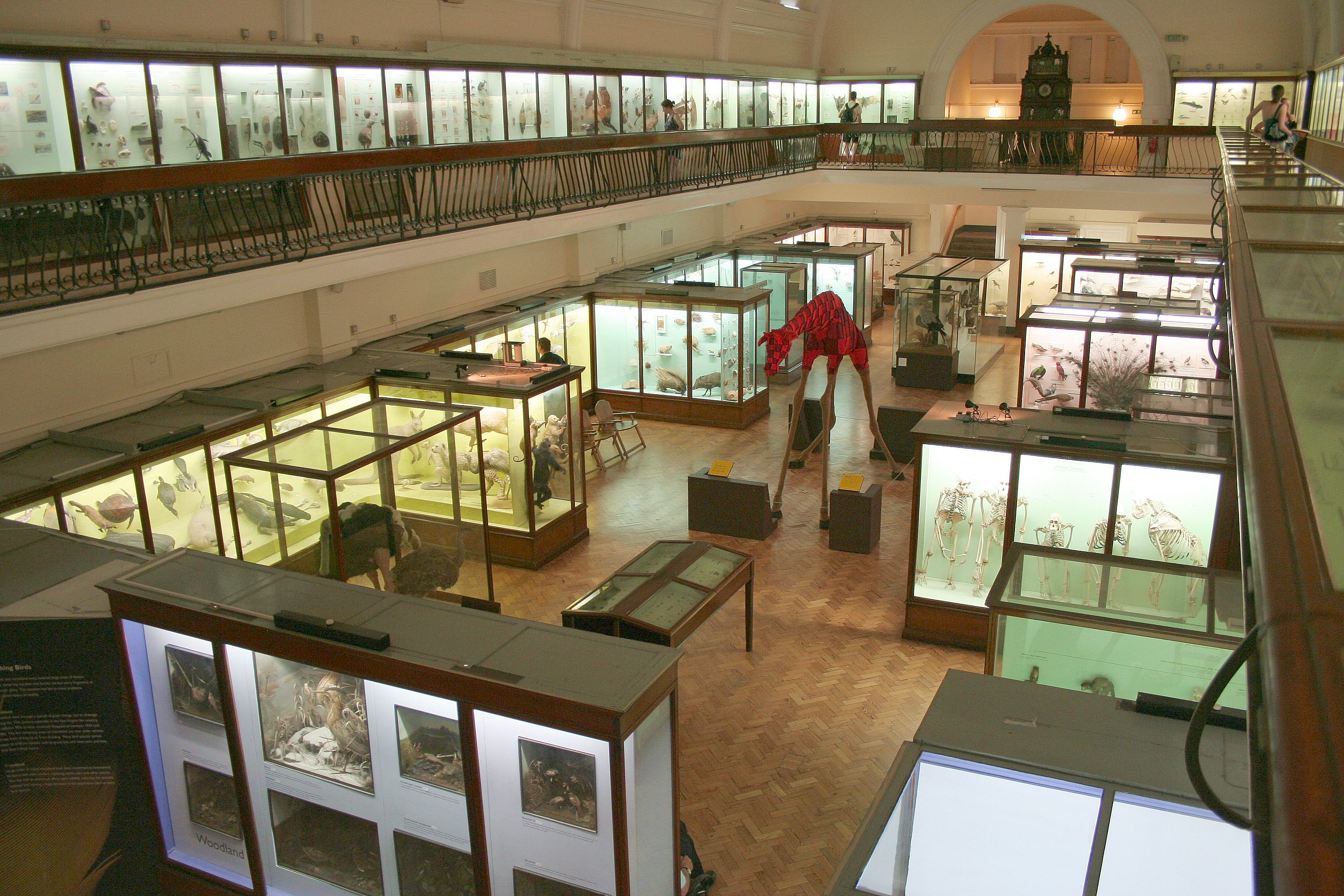
The Natural History Gallery with the overstuffed walrus replaced with a giraffe model in July 2013

== See also ==
- List of music museums
