= Arthur Willmer =

English cricketer and British Army officer (1890–1916)

Personal information
- Full name: Arthur Franklin Willmer
- Born: 10 January 1890; Claughton, Cheshire, England
- Died: 20 September 1916 (aged 26); Rouen, Normandy, France
- Batting: Unknown
- Bowling: Right-arm fast

Domestic team information
- Years: Team
- 1912: Oxford University
- 1914: Cheshire

Career statistics
Competition	First-class
Matches	1
Runs scored	12
Batting average	–
100s/50s	–/–
Top score	7*
Balls bowled	60
Wickets	0
Bowling average	–
5 wickets in innings	–
10 wickets in match	–
Best bowling	–
Catches/stumpings	–/–
- Source: Cricinfo, 27 February 2019

Arthur Franklin Willmer (10 January 1890 – 20 September 1916) was an English first-class cricketer and British Army officer.

== Biography ==
Willmer was born at Claughton to Arthur Washington Willmer, a JP and cotton broker, and his wife Janet Mary Willmer (née Cooper). He was educated at the nearby Birkenhead School, where he played cricket for four years, captaining the college in his last two. From Birkenhead he went up to Brasenose College, Oxford to study law on an open scholarship. While studying at Oxford, Willmer made one appearance in first-class cricket for Oxford University against the Free Foresters at Oxford in 1912. He batted twice during the match, ending each innings unbeaten on 5 and 7 respectively. He bowled ten overs across the match with his right-arm fast bowling, conceding 36 runs. After graduating, Willmer passed both of his intermediate and final exams to be called to the bar. He played minor counties cricket for Cheshire in 1914, making two appearances in the Minor Counties Championship.

He joined the Inns of Court Officers' Training Corps in October 1914, before enlisting in the 9th Battalion of the Rifle Brigade in December 1914. He travelled to France in early 1915 and was severely wounded in the jaw by shrapnel in June of that year, returning to action after recovering over a period of months. He was promoted to both the temporary ranks of lieutenant and captain in October 1915, the latter while commanding a company, however this appointment was cancelled in April 1916. Willmer was once again wounded by shrapnel during the Battle of the Somme on 18 September 1916, dying from his wounds two days later at Rouen. He was buried at the St. Sever Cemetery in Rouen.

His brother was the histologist Nevill Willmer, while another brother, Gordon Willmer, was a judge.
