= John Rogers (cricketer, born 1910) =

English cricketer and British Army officer

Personal information
- Full name: John Hickling Rogers
- Born: 7 August 1910; Birkenhead, Cheshire, England
- Died: 6 September 1968 (aged 58); Bangkok, Thailand
- Batting: Right-handed

Domestic team information
- Years: Team
- 1930–1934: Cheshire
- 1932: Oxford University

Career statistics
Competition	First-class
Matches	3
Runs scored	26
Batting average	5.20
100s/50s	–/–
Top score	9
Catches/stumpings	2/–
- Source: Cricinfo, 27 February 2019

John Hickling Rogers (7 August 1910 – 6 September 1968) was an English first-class cricketer and British Army officer.

Rogers was born at Birkenhead to John Hickling Rogers, Sr., and was educated at Birkenhead School. From Birkenhead he went up to Merton College, Oxford. While at Oxford he played first-class cricket for Oxford University in 1932, making three appearances against Leicestershire, Lancashire, and the touring South Americans. Across his three matches, Rogers scored 26 runs with a high score of 9. He also played minor counties cricket for Cheshire from 1930–1934, making twenty appearances in the Minor Counties Championship.

Rogers served in the British Army during the Second World War, joining the Cheshire Regiment as a second lieutenant in April 1940. He was promoted to the rank of lieutenant in April 1943. He died at Bangkok in September 1968.
