= Ewan Anderson =

English academic expert on geopolitics, economic and social geography (born 1938)

Personal information
- Full name: Ewan William Anderson
- Born: 28 March 1938 (age 88); Bromley, Kent, England
- Batting: Right-handed
- Bowling: Right-arm fast-medium

Domestic team information
- Years: Team
- 1961: Oxford University Cricket Club

Career statistics
Competition	First-class
Matches	12
Runs scored	38
Batting average	3.80
100s/50s	0/0
Top score	13*
Balls bowled	1,375
Wickets	18
Bowling average	40.38
5 wickets in innings	0
10 wickets in match	0
Best bowling	3/69
Catches/stumpings	1/–
- Source: CricketArchive, 10 August 2008

Ewan William Anderson (born 28 March 1938) is an English academic expert on geopolitics, economic and social geography. He is also a former English first-class cricketer who played all his games for Oxford University Cricket Club; and has exhibited his drawings of trees in both Britain and the US.

Anderson's work has focused upon geopolitics: the application of all facets of geography in political decision-making and development studies. His particular emphasis has been on applied research in the arid and semi-arid zone, with special reference to the Middle East; on water and minerals resources issues; and on international boundary disputes. He is also an expert on child welfare issues.

Anderson is emeritus professor of geopolitics at the University of Durham, England. He was also visiting professor of Middle Eastern Development Studies at the University of Exeter, England; Visiting professor at York St John University; Special Adviser to the Strategic Studies Research Centre, University of Al Akhawayn, Morocco; and Distinguished Research Fellow, Centre for International Trade and Security, University of Georgia, USA. He was visiting professor at all three US armed services academies.

== Career ==
After completing his education at Dulwich College and service in the Royal Navy, he attended St Edmund Hall, Oxford, and first played for Oxford University Cricket Club in 1961. His highest score of 13* came when playing for Oxford University in the match against Leicestershire County Cricket Club. His best bowling of 3/69 came when playing for Oxford University in the match against Glamorgan County Cricket Club. He played against the touring teams from Australia (1961) and Pakistan (1962). He also played Rugby for the university.

After graduating, he worked as a teacher at Downside and Birkenhead schools. In 1972, he was appointed principal lecturer and Head of Geography at the College of the Venerable Bede, Durham, and in 1979 became lecturer in geography at the University of Durham. In 1995 he was appointed Professor of Geopolitics at the Centre for Middle Eastern and Islamic Studies at Durham, a post he held until 2001.

In carrying out research and practical studies on international boundaries, refugee movements, development, strategic resources and transboundary problems, particularly of water, he has worked for many governments and for the United Nations. For six years he was in charge of boundary research for Saudi Arabia. He has also worked as strategic analyst to SACEUR (Supreme Allied Commander Europe) at SHAPE (Supreme Headquarters Allied Powers Europe), and is a member of the UK Development, Concepts and Doctrine Centre panel on future defence issues. For most of his career, he worked with and carried out research for the Royal Navy and retired as a Commander RNR in 1991.

His main fields of study have included :-

- International boundaries, including research for the World Court of Justice and for a number of Middle East national governments
- Water resources and related issues in the Middle East
- International defence issues, including strategy, logistics and procurement
- Child welfare, particularly in relation to boarding schools.

From 1973 to 1991 he was research officer with the UK Boarding Schools Association, Director of the DES Clearing House for Boarding, and edited the journal Boarding Education. From 2000 to 2005, he was honorary professor of residential child welfare at the University of York.

He has worked in over 70 countries, contributed to a large number of international research programmes and conferences, and been a visiting professor at universities in Qatar, Barcelona, Malta, and the US. He holds doctorates in geography, politics and residential education. He is a former president of the International Federation of Educative Communities (England and Wales), a member of the Residential Forum and a fellow of the Dartington Social Research Unit. He was awarded a Leverhulme Emeritus Fellowship in 2008 and in 2017, he was awarded a Doctorate of Letters by Oxford University.

In 2011, he was commissioned to draw the Heritage Trees of the Royal Botanic Gardens, Kew. In addition, several exhibitions of his drawings of trees from nature have been held in recent years, at Durham Cathedral, the Royal Horticultural Society at Wisley, the Royal Botanic Gardens at Kew, and the River and Rowing Museum at Henley-on-Thames, as well as in the United States.

== Selected works ==
In a statistical overview derived from writings by and about Ewan Anderson, OCLC/WorldCat encompasses roughly 50+ works in 100+ publications in 3 languages and 4,000+ library holdings.

- Strategic Minerals: The Geopolitical Problem for the United States (1988)
- Water Resources in the Arid Realm (1992)
- Atlas of World Flashpoints (1993)
- In Loco Parentis: Training Issues in Boarding and Residential Environments (1994)
- Strategic Minerals: Resource Geopolitics and Global Geo-Economics (1998)
- The Middle East: Geography and Geopolitics (2000)
- International Boundaries: A Geopolitical Atlas (2002)
- Residential and Boarding Education and Care for Young People: A Model for Good Practice (2005)
