= St Mary the Virgin, Great Warley =

Coordinates: 51.5862°N 0.2921°E

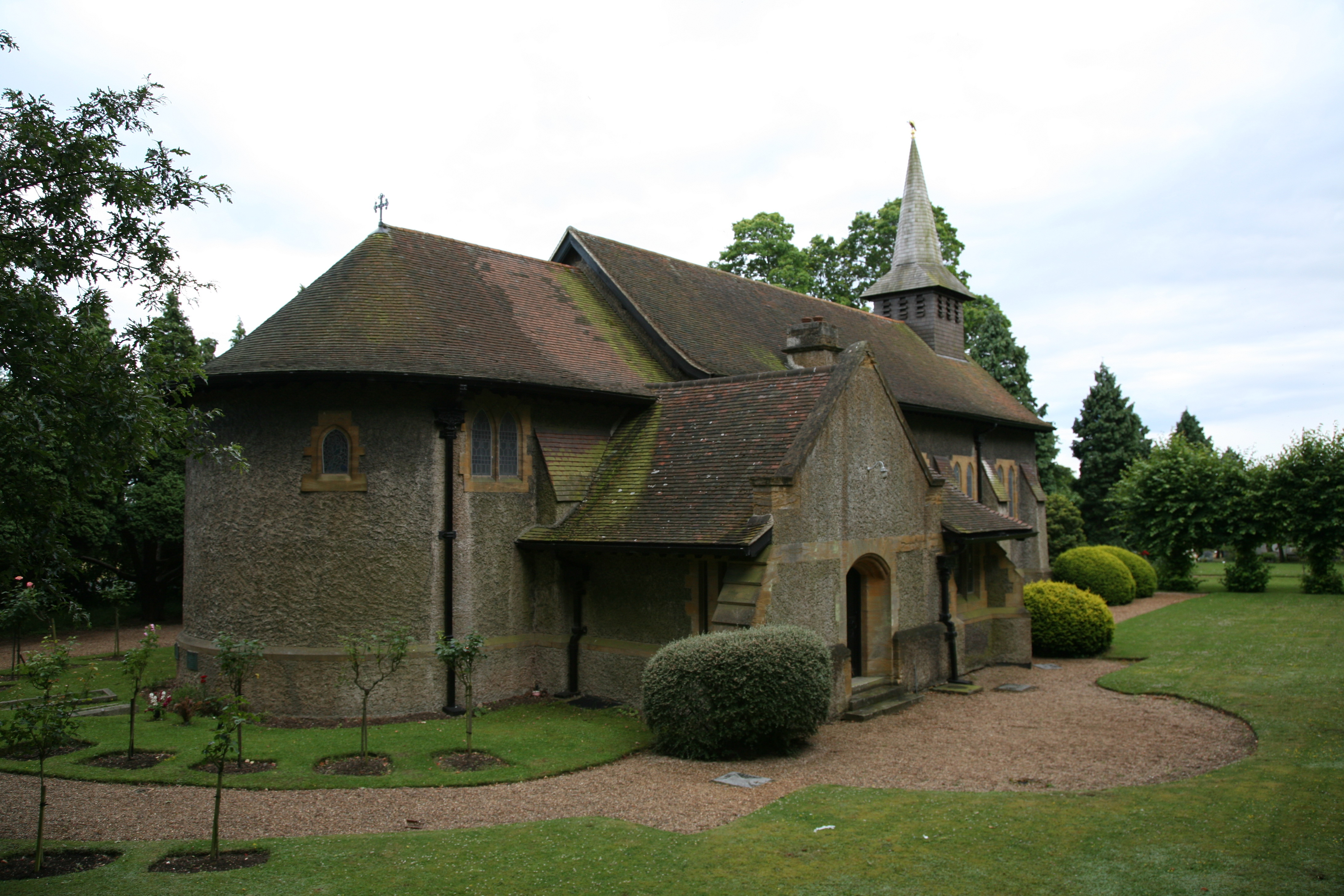
- St Mary the Virgin, Great Warley
- OS grid reference: TQ 58888 89990
- Location: Great Warley, Essex
- Country: England
- Denomination: Church of England

History
- Status: Active
- Consecrated: 1904

Architecture
- Functional status: Parish church
- Heritage designation: Grade I listed
- Architect: Charles Harrison Townsend

Administration
- Diocese: Diocese of Chelmsford
- Archdeaconry: Archdeaconry of Chelmsford
- Deanery: Deanery of Brentwood
- Parish: Great Warley

St. Mary the Virgin is a Grade I listed parish church for Great Warley in the Brentwood borough of Essex, England. It is noted for its unique Modern Style (British Art Nouveau style) interior, designed by Sir William Reynolds-Stephens.

Built in 1902 with money and land donated by the Heseltine family, and consecrated in 1904, the church is Grade I listed. The architect was Charles Harrison Townsend.

The churchyard contains a war grave of a Royal Army Ordnance Corps officer of World War II.

== Gallery ==
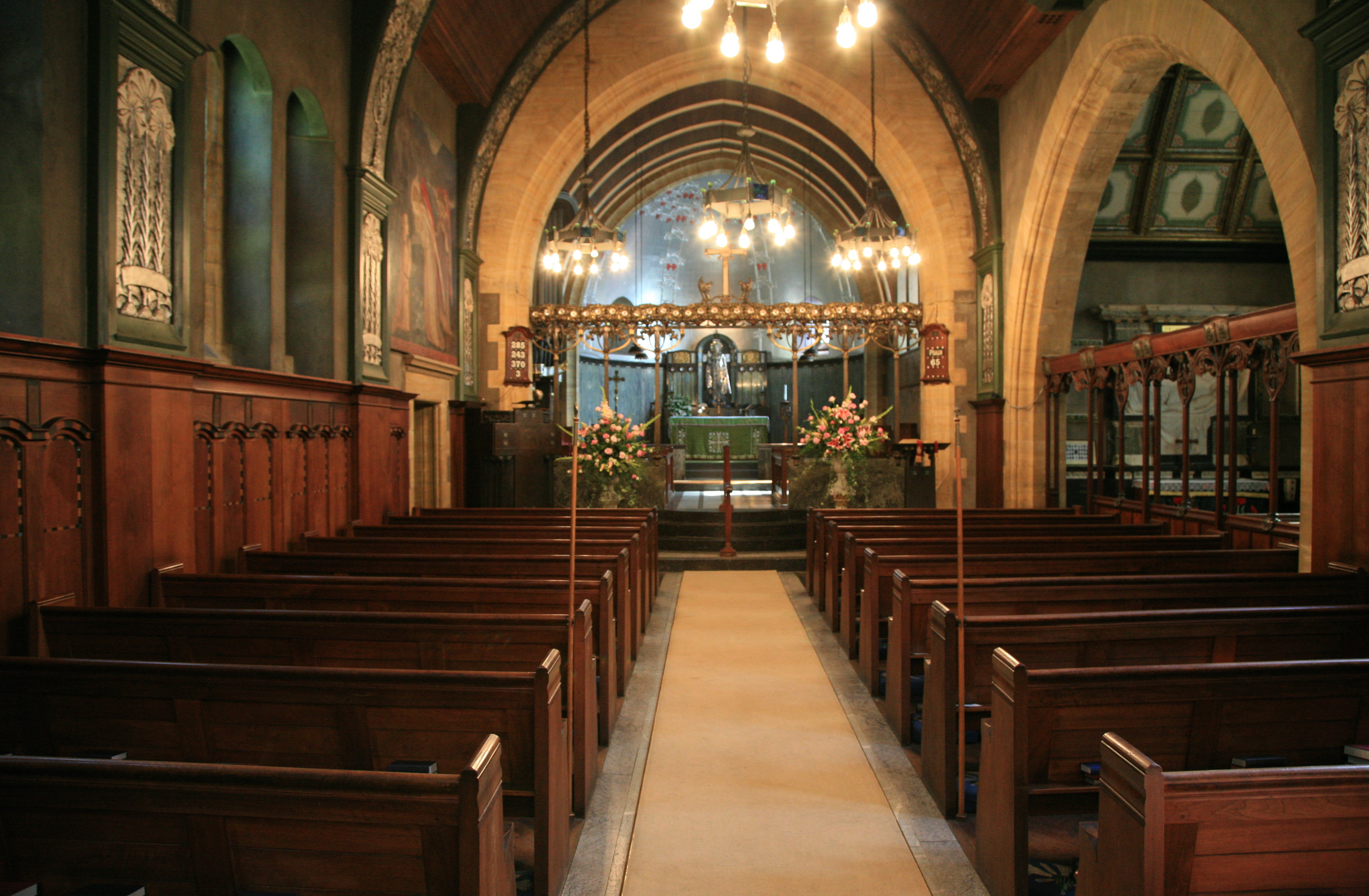

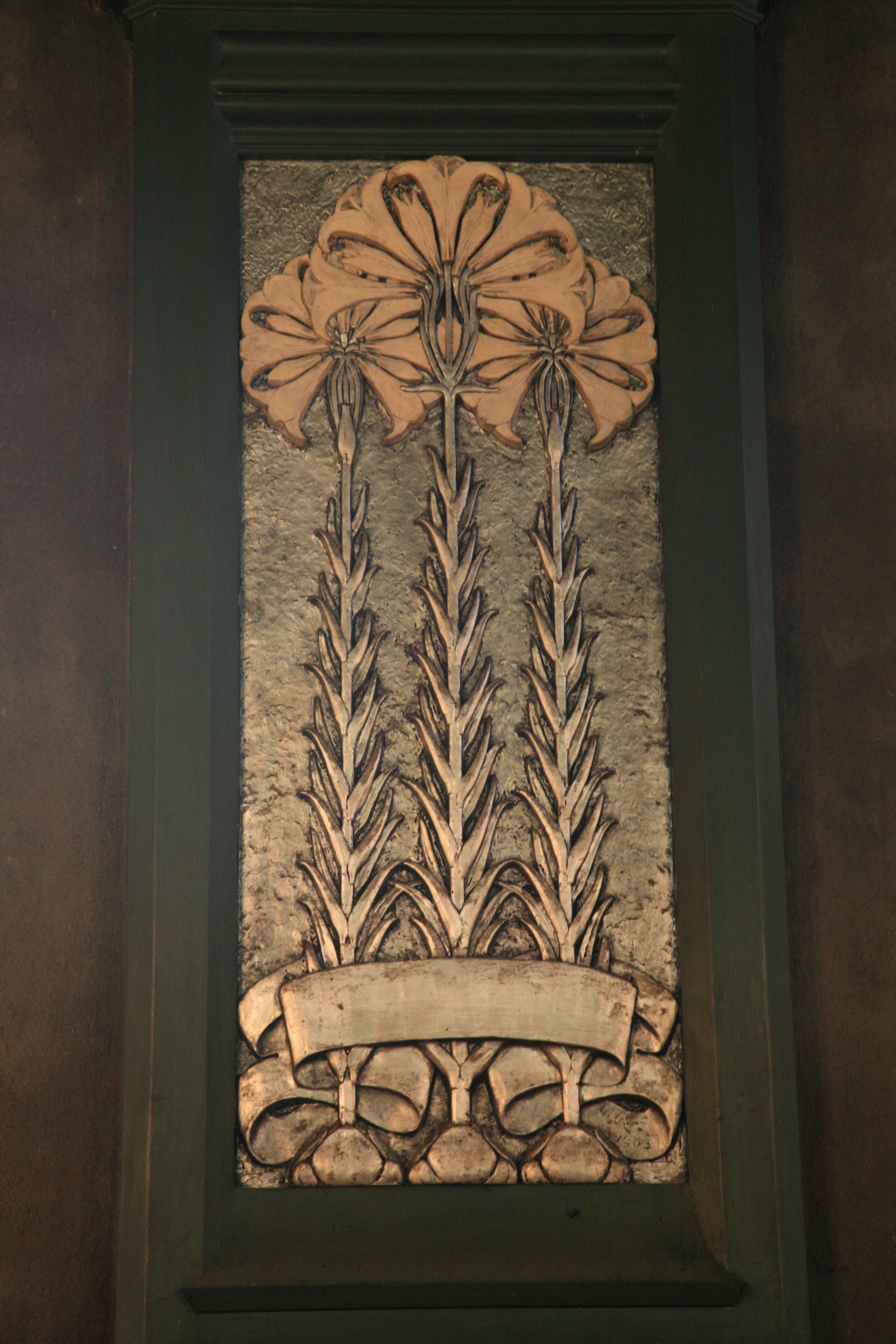

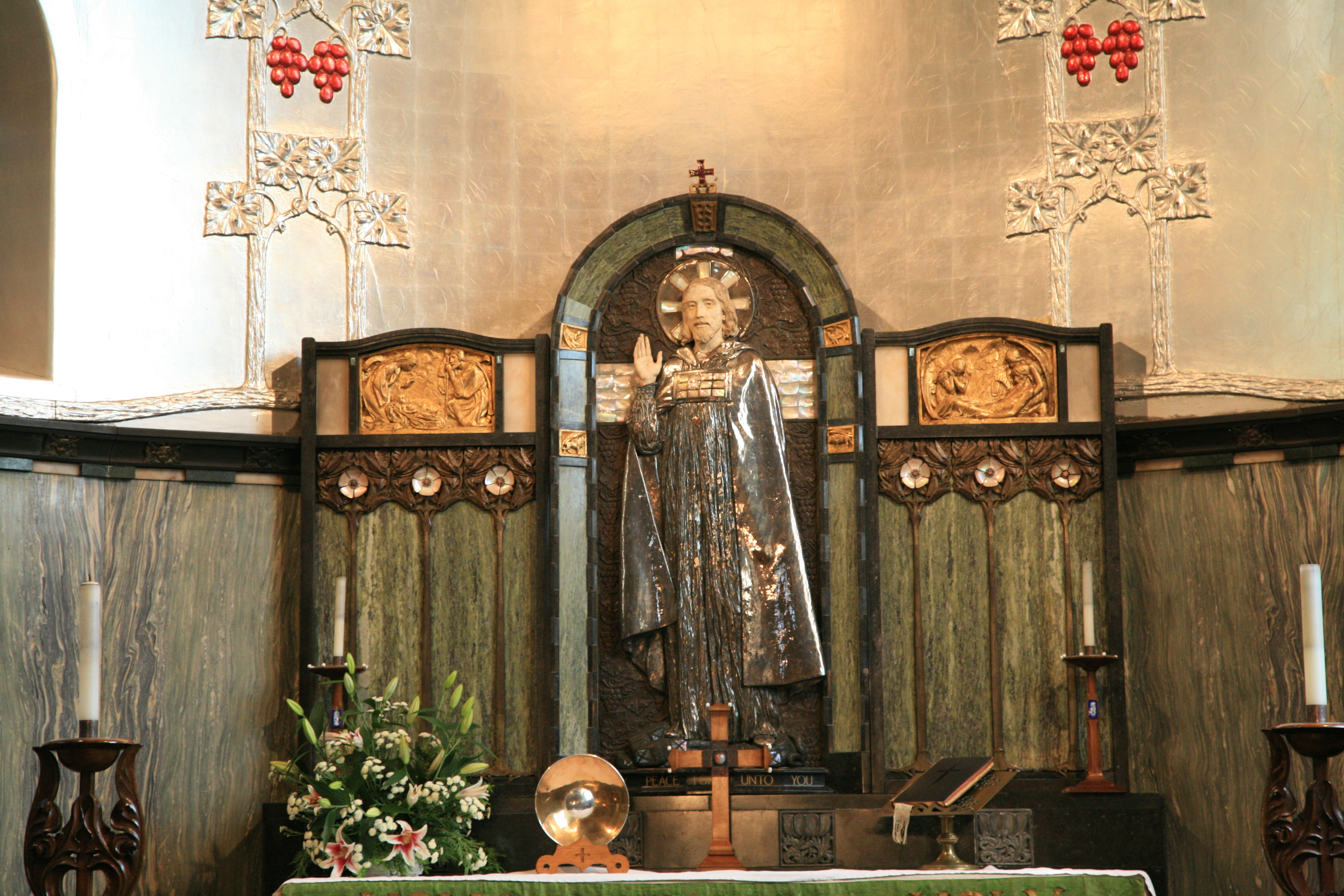

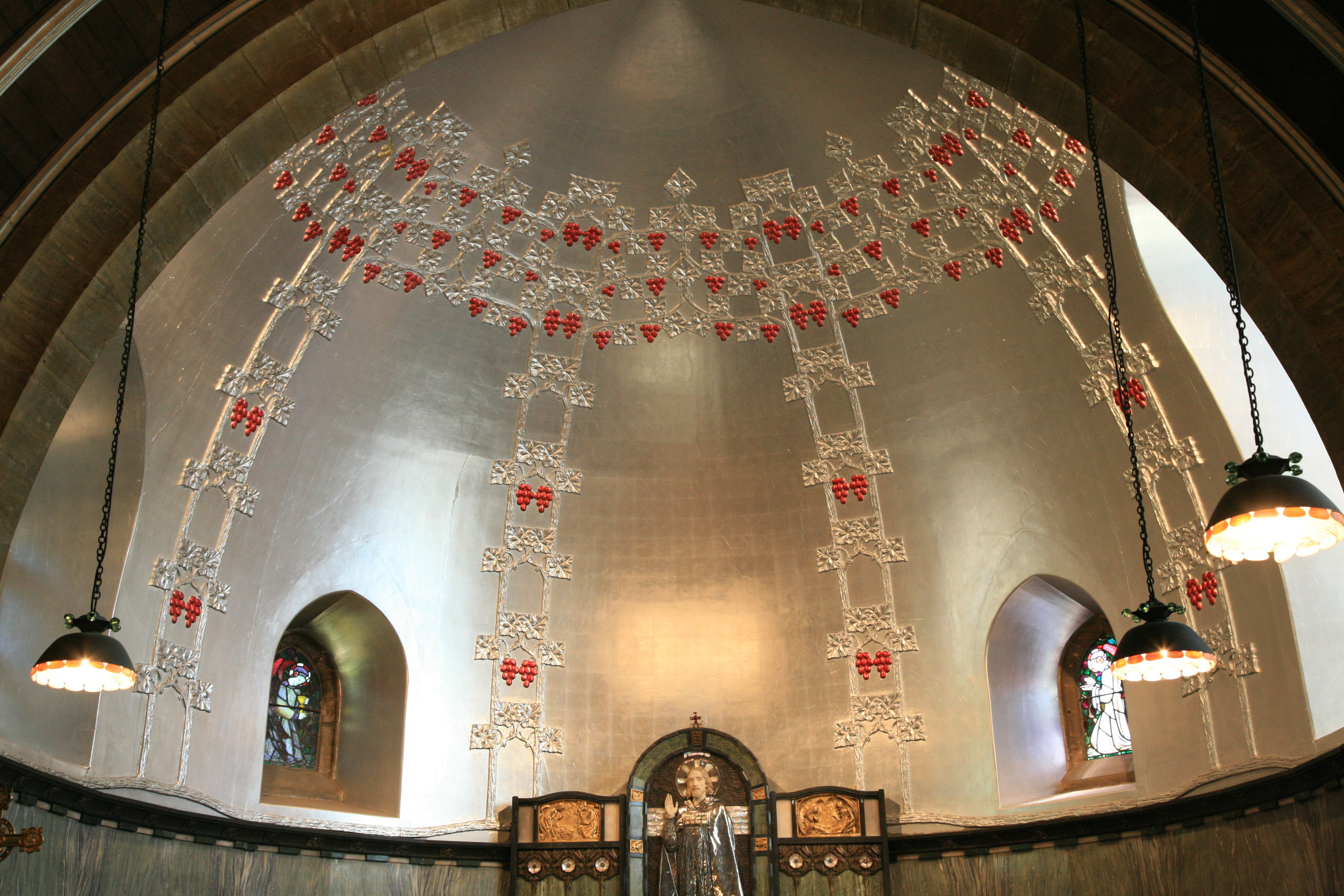

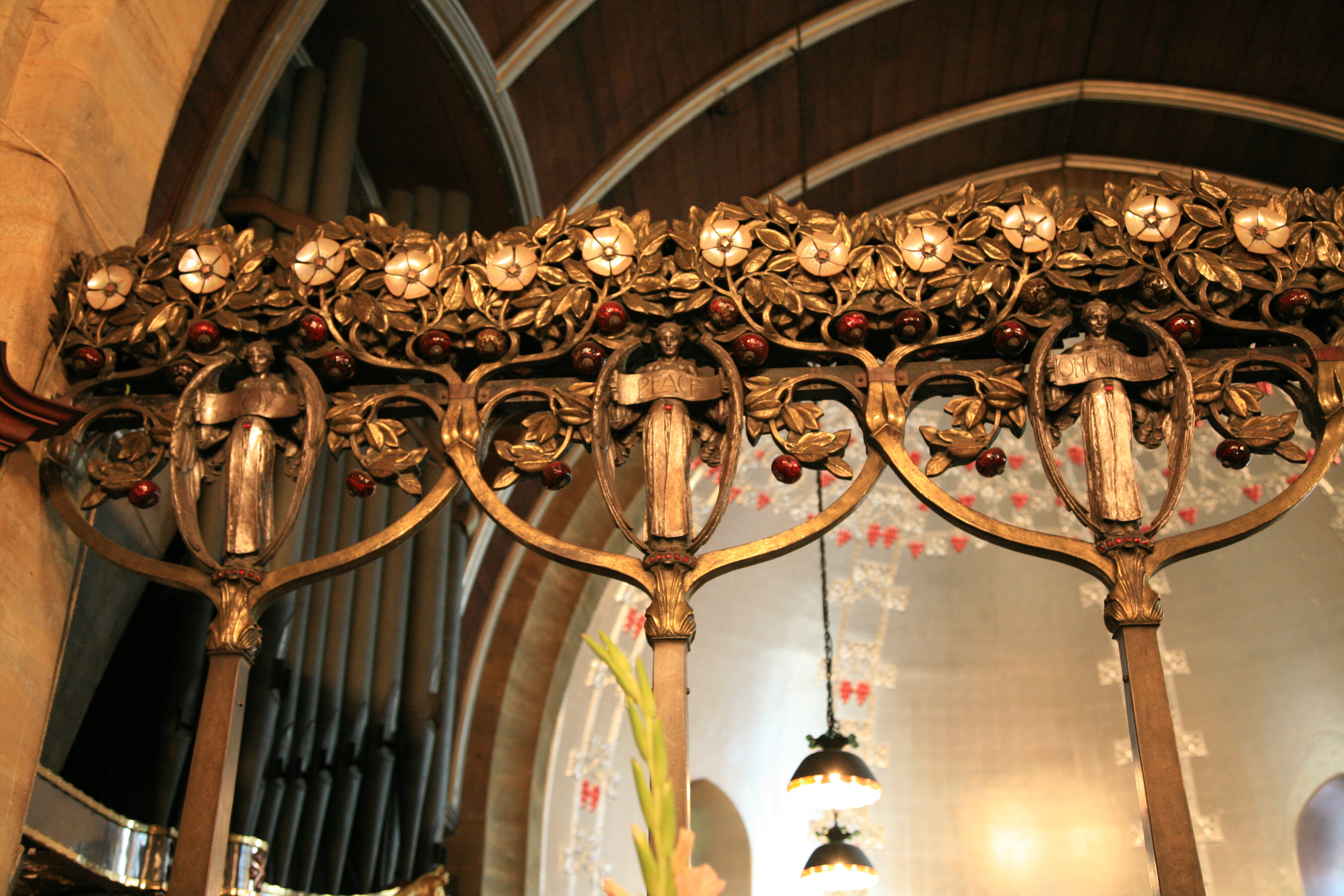

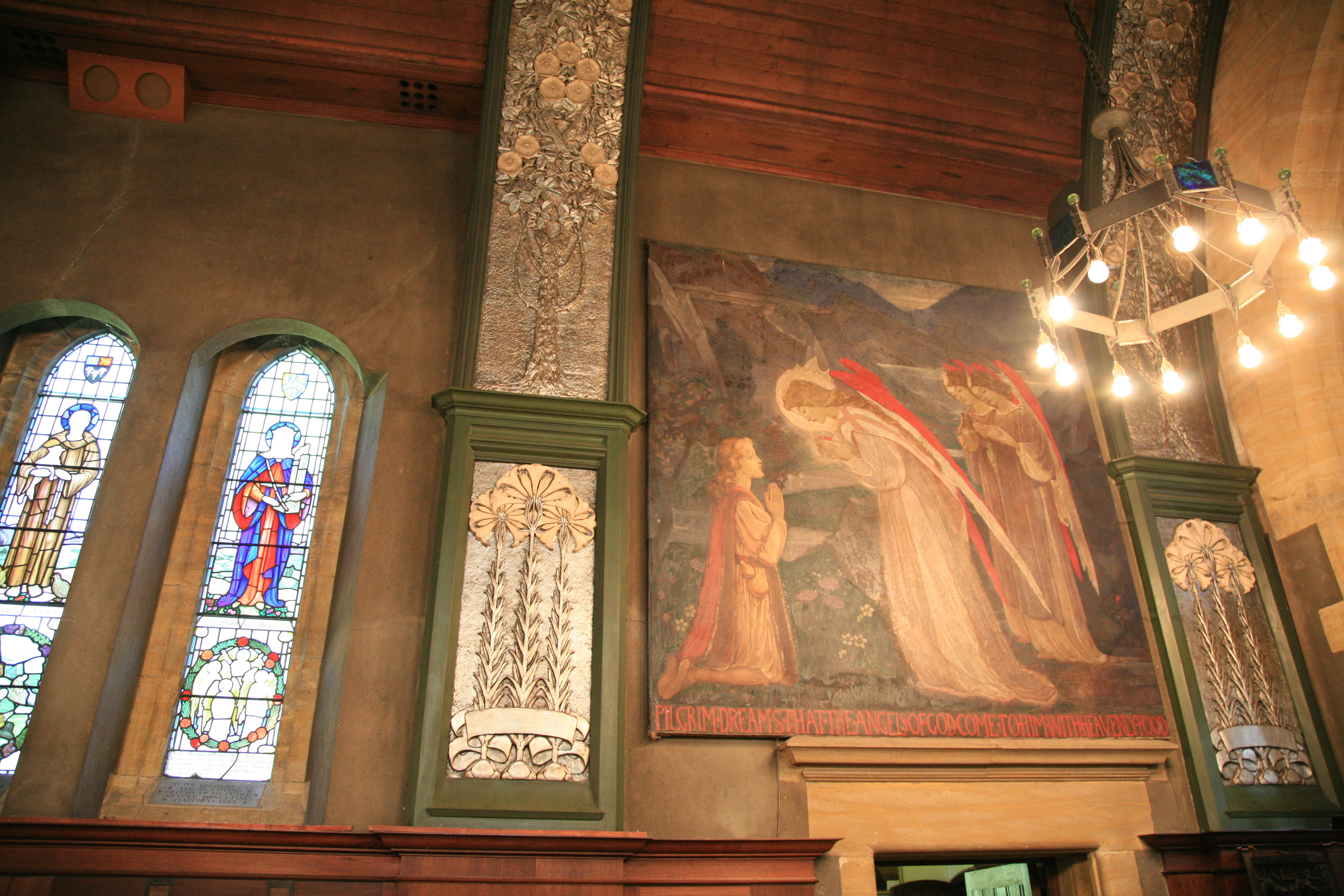

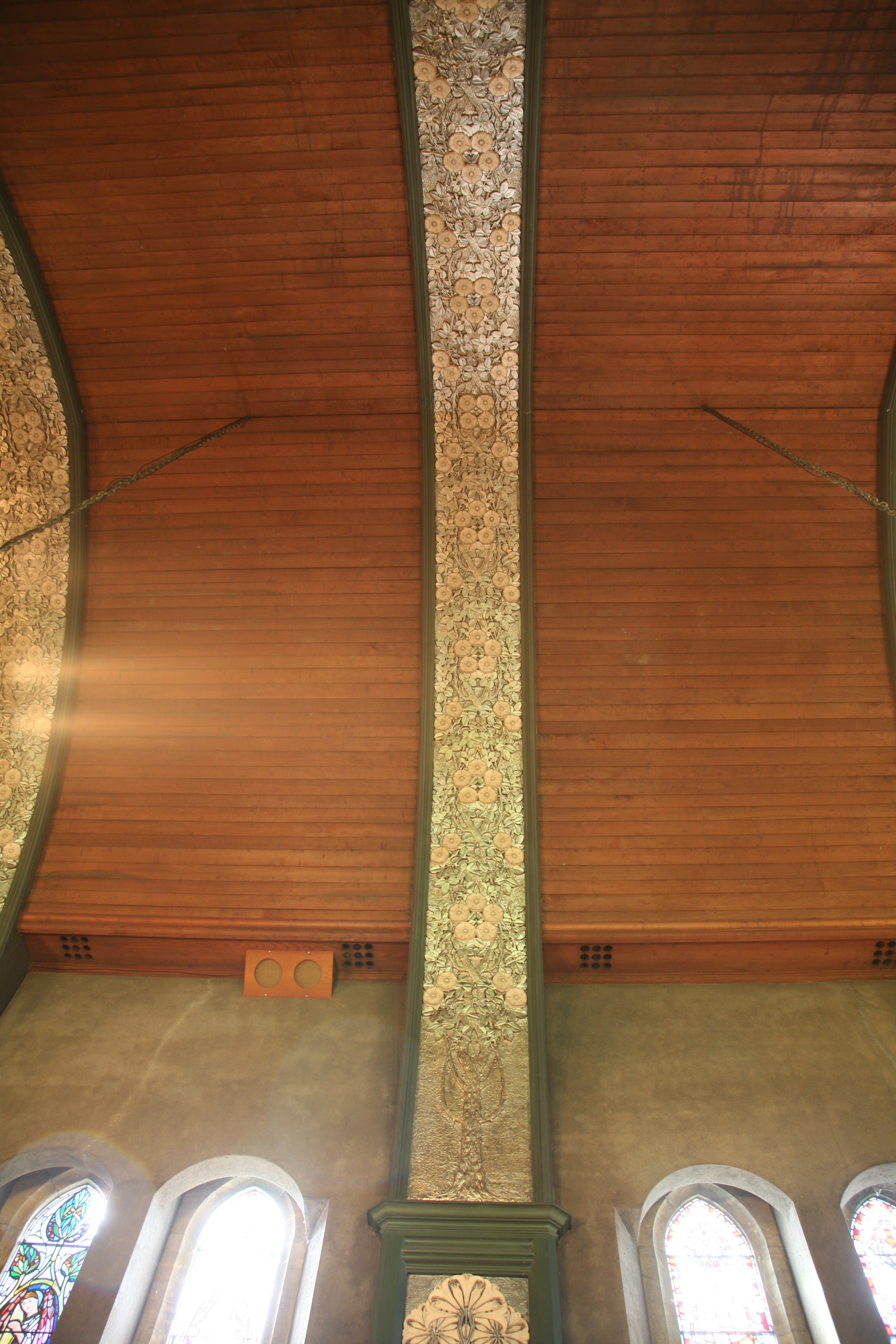
