= Gordon Willmer =

Sir Henry Gordon Willmer, OBE, TD (11 August 1899 – 17 May 1983) was an English lawyer and judge.

Willmer was from Birkenhead, Cheshire, the son of Arthur Willmer and the brother of the academic Nevill Willmer and the first-class cricketer Arthur Willmer. He was educated at Birkenhead School and Corpus Christi College, Cambridge. He was called to the bar by the Inner Temple in 1924 and practiced at the Admiralty bar. He took silk in 1939, shortly before the outbreak of the Second World War. He had retired from the Territorial Army in 1938, but in 1940 was commissioned and served in the coastal artillery.

He was appointed to the High Court shortly after the war, in December 1945, receiving the customary knighthood, and was assigned to the Probate, Divorce and Admiralty Division. In 1958 he was appointed a Lord Justice of Appeal and was sworn of the Privy Council. He retired in 1969. In retirement he worked an arbitrator.

During an illustrious career he "was the acknowledged master of Admiralty law" (Tasman Orient Line CV v Alliance Group Ltd) and sat as a Lord Justice of Appeal. He was awarded the honorary degree of Doctor of Laws by the University of Liverpool in 1966.
