= Charles Harrison Townsend =

English architect (1851–1928)

- Born: 13 May 1851; Birkenhead
- Died: 26 December 1928 (aged 77)
- Occupation: Architect
- Buildings: Whitechapel Art Gallery, The Horniman Museum

Charles Harrison Townsend (13 May 1851 – 26 December 1928) was an English architect. He was born in Birkenhead, educated at Birkenhead School and articled to the Liverpool architect Walter Scott in 1870. He moved to London with his family in 1880 and entered partnership with the London architect Thomas Lewis Banks in 1884. Townsend became a member of the Art Workers' Guild in 1888 and in the same year was elected a Fellow of the more conservative Royal Institute of British Architects. He remained an active member of both organisations throughout his career and was elected Master of the Art Workers' Guild in 1903. He is important Modern Style (British Art Nouveau style) architect whose favourite motif was the tree.

== Works ==
Townsend's career was devoted mainly to domestic and small-scale ecclesiastical commissions, but his reputation rests principally on three strikingly original public buildings in London: Bishopsgate Institute (1892–1894); the Whitechapel Art Gallery (1895–1899, opened 1901); and the Horniman Museum (1898–1901).

These buildings are usually identified with the Art Nouveau or Arts and Crafts styles, but Townsend's originality makes his style difficult to classify. Service calls him a “rogue” architect. Pevsner describes the buildings as "without question the most remarkable example of a reckless repudiation of tradition among English architects of the time". The Horniman Museum in particular moved a contemporary observer, writing in 1902, the year after the building was opened, to hail it as "a new series of frank and fearless thoughts expressed and co-ordinated in stone". Townsend seems to have been influenced by the Romanesque Revival style of the American architect H. H. Richardson—he was certainly familiar with that architect's work as his journalist brother, Horace Townsend, had written a lengthy article about Richardson.

Notable among Townsend's other works are: All Saints, Ennismore Gardens, London (now the Russian Orthodox Cathedral) (1892); the picturesque St. Martin, Blackheath, Surrey (which is apparently modelled on an Italian wayside chapel) (1893); the United Free Church, Woodford Green (1901), and St. Mary the Virgin, Great Warley, Essex (1902).

Among Townsend's employees was the Finnish architect Gustaf Strengell, in 1903, who on his return to Finland became one of the country's most noted architect theorists, curators and critics, though practicing little as an architect. Together with friend, architect-critic Sigurd Frosterus, Strengell argued against the predominant Art Nouveau style architecture in Finland at that time (known as Jugendstil, and epitomized by the works of Eliel Saarinen), instead championing a more idiosyncratic modernism, of a kind that could also be seen in the works of Townsend.

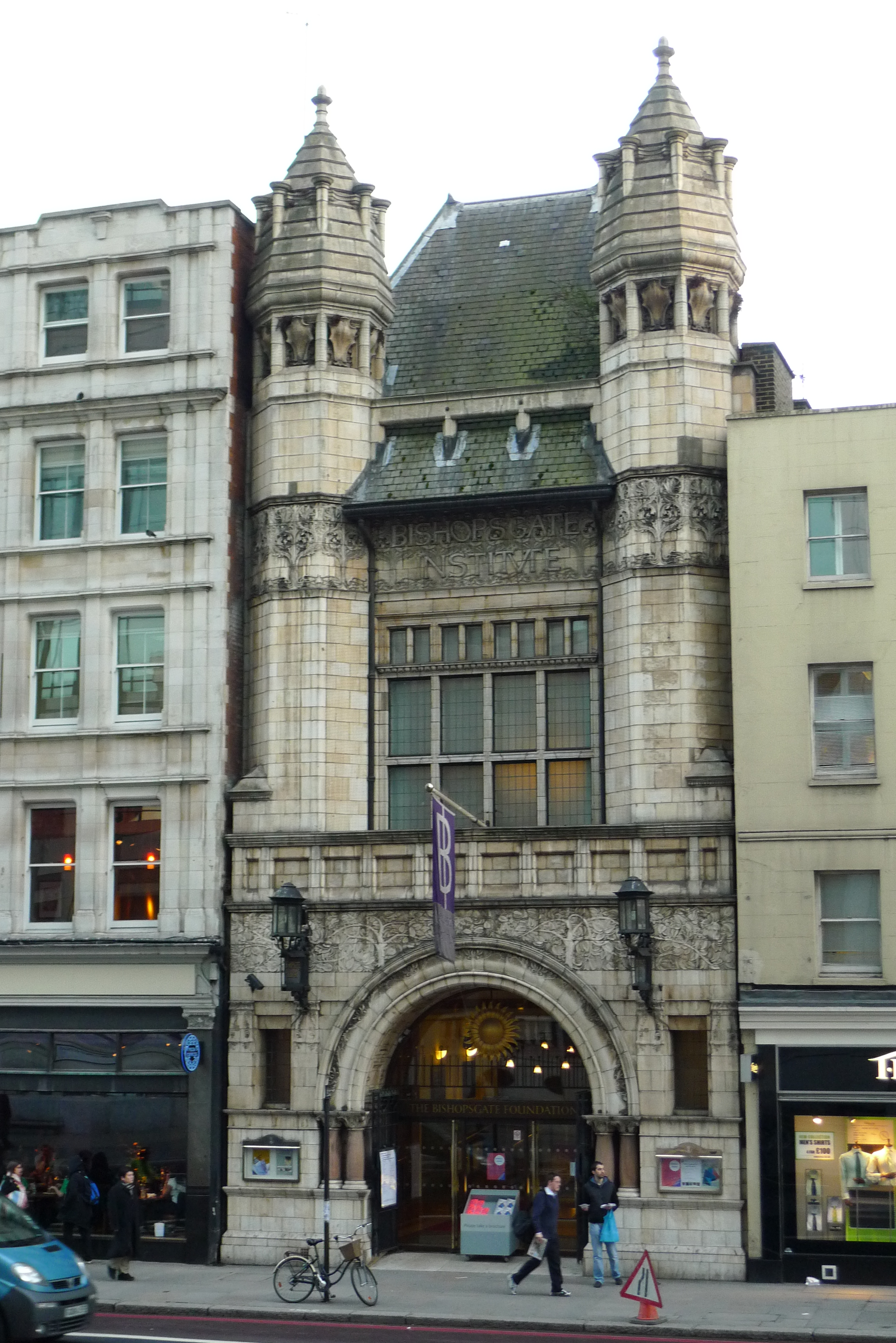
Bishopsgate Institute

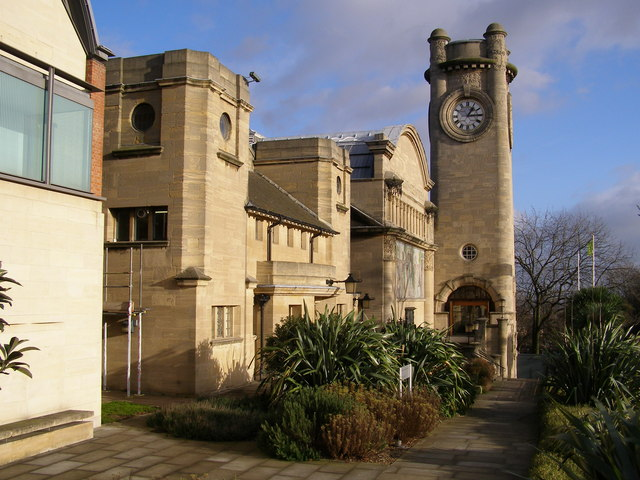
The Horniman Museum

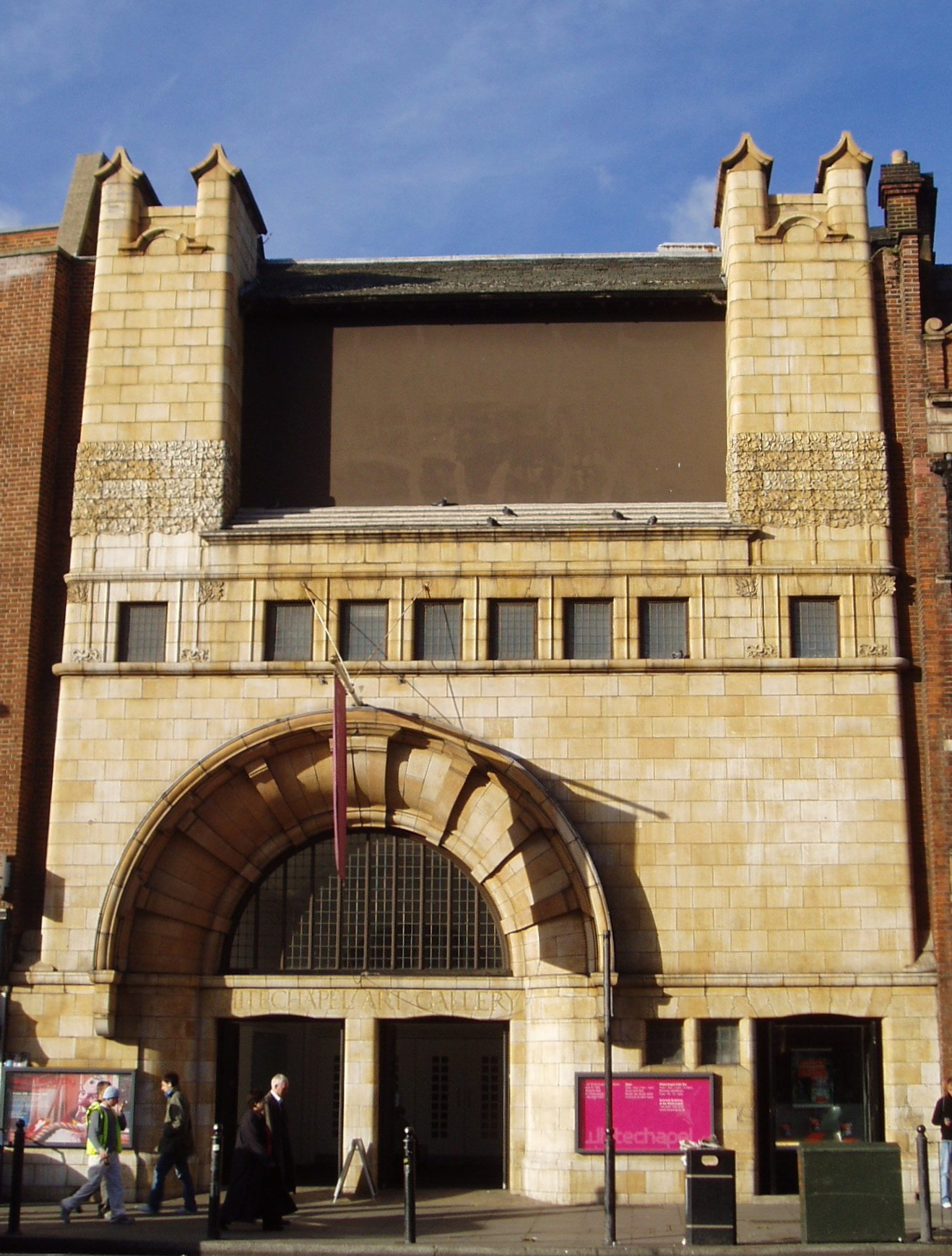
The Whitechapel Gallery

== Buildings ==
- The Horniman Museum, Forest Hill (1901; Library and Lecture Hall added, 1910)
- The Village Hall, Panshanger (1910) Now Mayflower Place
- Woodford Green URC Church (1904)
- St Mary the Virgin, Great Warley, Essex (1902)
- Stone Cross, West Meon (1901)
- The Whitechapel Art Gallery (designed 1897, built 1898–99)
- Cliff Towers, Devonshire (1898)
- The Bishopsgate Institute (1894)
- St Martin's Church, Blackheath, Surrey (1893)
- Blackheath Village, Surrey (c.1888–1907)
- (Former) All Saints Church, Kensington (with Lewis Vulliamy) restoration and additions (1887–1897) Now, Russian Orthodox Cathedral of the Dormition of the Mother of God and All Saints
- Kirkland Mission Church (1886)
- 7 Dene Road, Northwood, Middlesex (1903–04)
