= Nevill Willmer =

British professor of Histology

(Edward) Nevill "E.N." Willmer, FRS (15 August 1902 – 8 April 2001) was a British academic who was Professor of Histology at Cambridge University from 1966 to 1969.

== Biography ==
Willmer was born in Birkenhead in 1902 to a cotton broker named Arthur Washington Willmer and his wife Janet. He was educated at Birkenhead School and Corpus Christi College, Oxford (B.A. 1924). He became a demonstrator at Manchester University before being elected a Fellow of Clare College in 1936. He was elected a Fellow of the Royal Society in 1960 and became professor emeritus in 1969.

Willmer's major work was a three-volume treatise on tissue culture, "Cells and Tissue in Culture: methods, biology and physiology" (1965). This was a significant based on an immense amount of labour that went into the process of exploring and satisfying the dietary and other requirements of cells and tissues that were grown in the laboratory. Other books he wrote included Waen and the Willmers and several books on Grantchester, to where he retired in 1969.

Willmer also created oil paintings detailing landscapes, mainly in Cambridgeshire and Mid Wales. He designed the Fellows' Garden in Clare College. He also designed at least one other in Cambridge but the Fellows' Garden is a lasting legacy of his vision.

Willmer died in April 2001 at the age of 98 in Grantchester.

== Family ==
He married Henrietta "Penny" Rowlatt in 1939; they had two sons and two daughters.

His brother, Gordon Willmer, was a judge. His eldest brother, Arthur Willmer, was a first-class cricketer and British Army officer, who was killed during the Battle of the Somme.

== Publications ==
Willmer's books include;

- Retinal Structure and Colour Vision: A Restatement and an Hypothesis (1946)
- Tissue Culture: the Growth and Differentiation of Normal Tissues in Artificial Media (1954)
- Cytology and Evolution (1969)
- Old Grantchester (1976)
- What the Poet Saw (1998)
