= William Warwick =

William Eldon Warwick
- Born: 12 November 1912; Birkenhead, UK
- Died: 27 February 1999 (aged 86)
- Occupation: Master Mariner
- Known for: First Master of the Queen Elizabeth 2 (QE2)
- Children: Eldon J WARWICK, Ronald W Warwick and David B Warwick.

Captain William "Bil" Warwick, CBE was a merchant sailor and the Master of Cunard's Queen Elizabeth 2 (QE2), the first person to hold that position.

He was born on 12 November 1912 in Birkenhead, England.

He appeared as a castaway on the BBC Radio programme Desert Island Discs on 18 September 1967.

He was made a Commander of the Order of the British Empire (CBE) in 1971.

He died on 27 February 1999. His son, Captain Ronald W Warwick, was a master of the Queen Elizabeth 2 during the time of his death. This was the first time a father and son had made it to the rank of captain of the Cunard and the first time a father and son had been in command of the same ship as Captain BIL WARWICK was QE2's first Master. Both Captains would become Cunard Commodores as Commmodor RON WARWICK would be Queen Mary 2 first Master. Eldon J Warwick would become the Royal Naval Reserve and was the Commodore of the Cunard Line. He had three sons, all of whom spent time at sea.
