= Clifford Embleton =

British geologist

Clifford Embleton (11 May 1931 – 4 July 1994) was a British geomorphologist.

== Early life and education ==
He was born in Bromborough at that time in Cheshire. He was the son of Arthur Thomas Embleton (1895–1954), a shipping clerk, and Constance Fitzgerald (1896–1948). He was educated at Birkenhead School and won an open exhibition at St John's College, Cambridge to read geography. He graduated in 1953 having won the Philip Lake Prize. His doctoral thesis in 1956 was on the glacial landforms of north Wales.

== Career ==
His research on glaciation in Wales and Norway led to the publication of a classic text on the subject, 'Geomorphology, Glacial and Periglacial' with Cuchlaine King, published by Hodder & Stoughton in May 1968, ISBN 0713153776 which was later substantially revised in 1975. He became a lecturer and then senior lecturer at Birkbeck College, London and University College London and became a professor at King's College, London in 1982. He published 75 academic papers and books on glaciation, geomorphology in Europe, geomorphological hazards and a geographical study of Africa.

== Personal life ==
He was a gifted organist and was elected fellow of the Royal College of Organists when only 18 years old. He married Davina Caroline Cherry, a general practitioner, in 1956 and they had three sons. After their divorce he married Christine Hamann in 1991. Davina Embleton died in 2025.
