= Edward Embleton =

English footballer

Personal information
- Date of birth: 1916
- Place of birth: South Moor, England
- Height: 5 ft 8 in (1.73 m)
- Position: Inside forward

Senior career*
Years	Team	Apps	(Gls)
1934–1935	Norwich City	0	(0)
1935–1937	Bradford City	3	(1)
1937–1938	Hartlepools United	22	(6)
1938–1939	Gateshead	17	(9)
1939	Doncaster Rovers	0	(0)
- * Club domestic league appearances and goals

Edward Embleton (born 1916) was an English professional footballer who played as an inside forward.

== Career ==
Born in South Moor, Embleton played for Norwich City, Bradford City, Hartlepools United, Gateshead and Doncaster Rovers.

For Bradford City he made three appearances in the Football League, scoring one goal.

== Sources ==
- Frost, Terry (1988). Bradford City A Complete Record 1903-1988. Breedon Books Sport. ISBN 0-907969-38-0.
- Joyce, Michael (2004). Football League Players' Records 1888 to 1939. Nottingham: Tony Brown. ISBN 1-899468-67-6.
