= Birkenhead High School Academy =

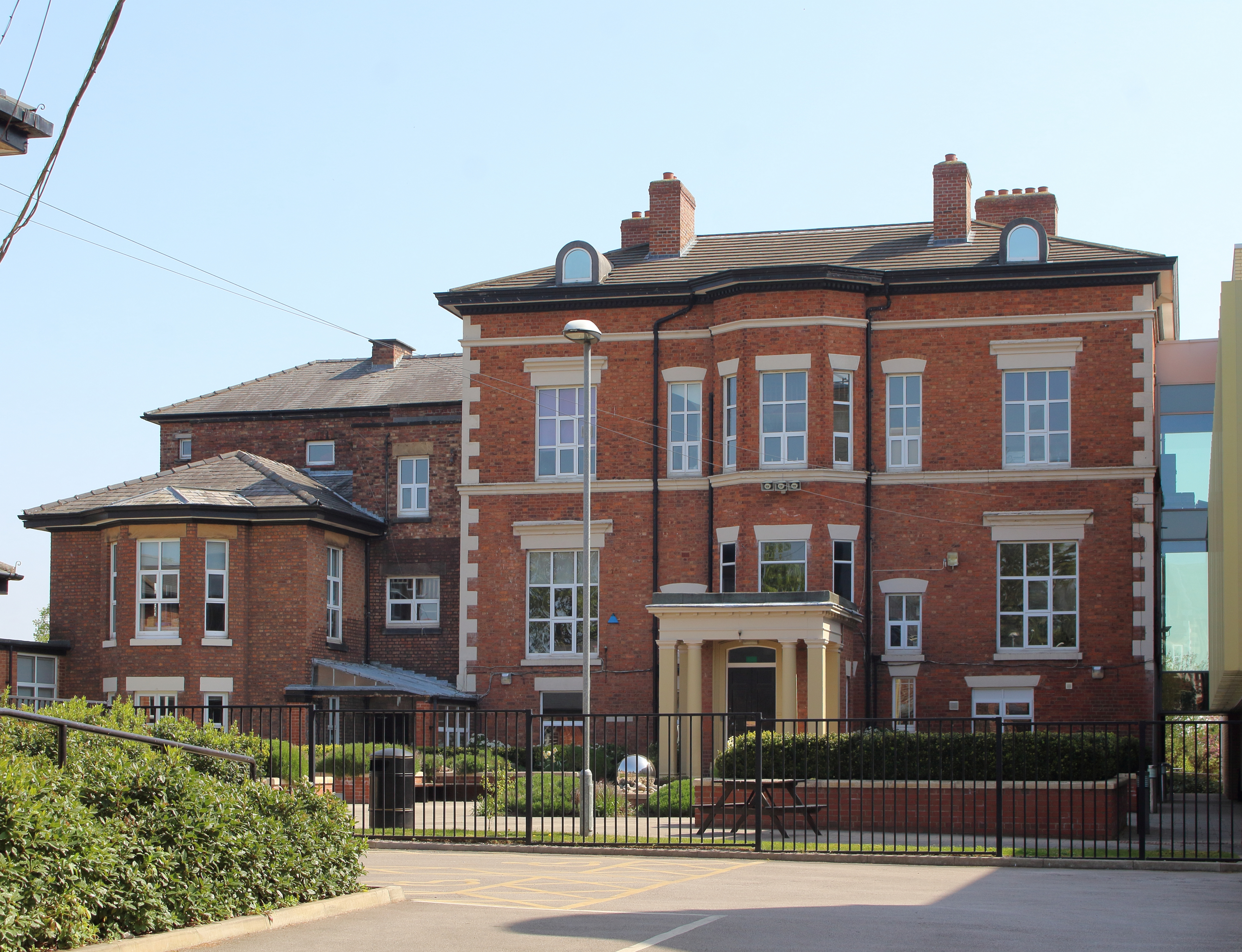

Location
- 86 Devonshire Place; Oxton, Wirral, CH43 1TY; England
- Coordinates: 53°23′18″N 3°03′01″W

Information
- Type: Academy
- Established: 1884 (2009 as an academy)
- Founder: Girls' Day School Trust
- Local authority: Wirral
- Department for Education URN: 135877 Tables
- Ofsted: Reports
- Principal: Mrs Elizabeth de Boorder
- Gender: Girls
- Age: 3 to 19
- Enrolment: 1,092
- Colours: Black and White
- Predecessor school: Birkenhead High School for Girls (until 2009)
- Website: School Website

Birkenhead High School Academy is an all-ability state funded girls' Academy in Birkenhead, Wirral.

== Introduction ==
Birkenhead High School was the main Wirral private girls' school, but in 2010 became a non-fee paying Academy. It remains a member of the Girls' Day School Trust, a national educational charity based in London. The school has sports facilities with a number of tennis courts, all-weather pitches, gymnasium and swimming pool. In addition to a wide academic curriculum, aided by IT facilities, there is a music and drama scene and a range of after school clubs. The Academy has a nursery, primary and secondary school.

It is situated on Devonshire Place just north of Trinity with Palm Grove Church. The school lies within the parish of Christ Church, Birkenhead although the tennis courts are in the parish of St Saviour's, and the playing fields are in the parish of St. James, Birkenhead.

== History ==
The High Schools Company opened Birkenhead High School for Girls in 1884 in a building on Village Road in Oxton, Birkenhead. In 1901 it was purchased by the Girls' Public Day School Company (GPDSC). The school moved into 86 Devonshire Place in September 1905. In 1918 the school acquired 31 Devonshire Place to be the home of the junior school. During World War Two the girls were evacuated to Shrewsbury High School.

=== Headmistresses ===
- 1917–1923: Edith Mabel Lucy Lees, (1878–1956)
- 1923–1930: Jessie Margaret Hunter McCaig (d. 1965)
- 1930–1952: H N Stephen (1891–1984)
- 1952–1963: Phyllis Edith Winter
- 1964–1970: Irene Hindmarsh, afterwards Principal of St Aidan's College, Durham University, 1970–1988
- 1971–1986: Freda Kellett
- 1986–c.1997: Kathleen Irving
- Mrs C Evans
- Mrs C Mann
- Mrs R Mahony
- Present: Mrs Elizabeth de Boorder

== Transition to Academy ==
Parents of pupils at the school were informed in September 2007 that the school was to become an Academy, with the GDST (Girls' Day School Trust) as the founding sponsor, so that the benefits of the schools might reach a wider cross-section of the community. Since then the facilities have been improved with a £12million building project.

As part of the state-funded system the Academy no longer charges fees. Fair banding is used to ensure a comprehensive intake of the full range of academic ability. Sixth Form admission is six GCSE passes at Grade B or above, including English and mathematics. The school's particular specialisms are Music and Mathematics.

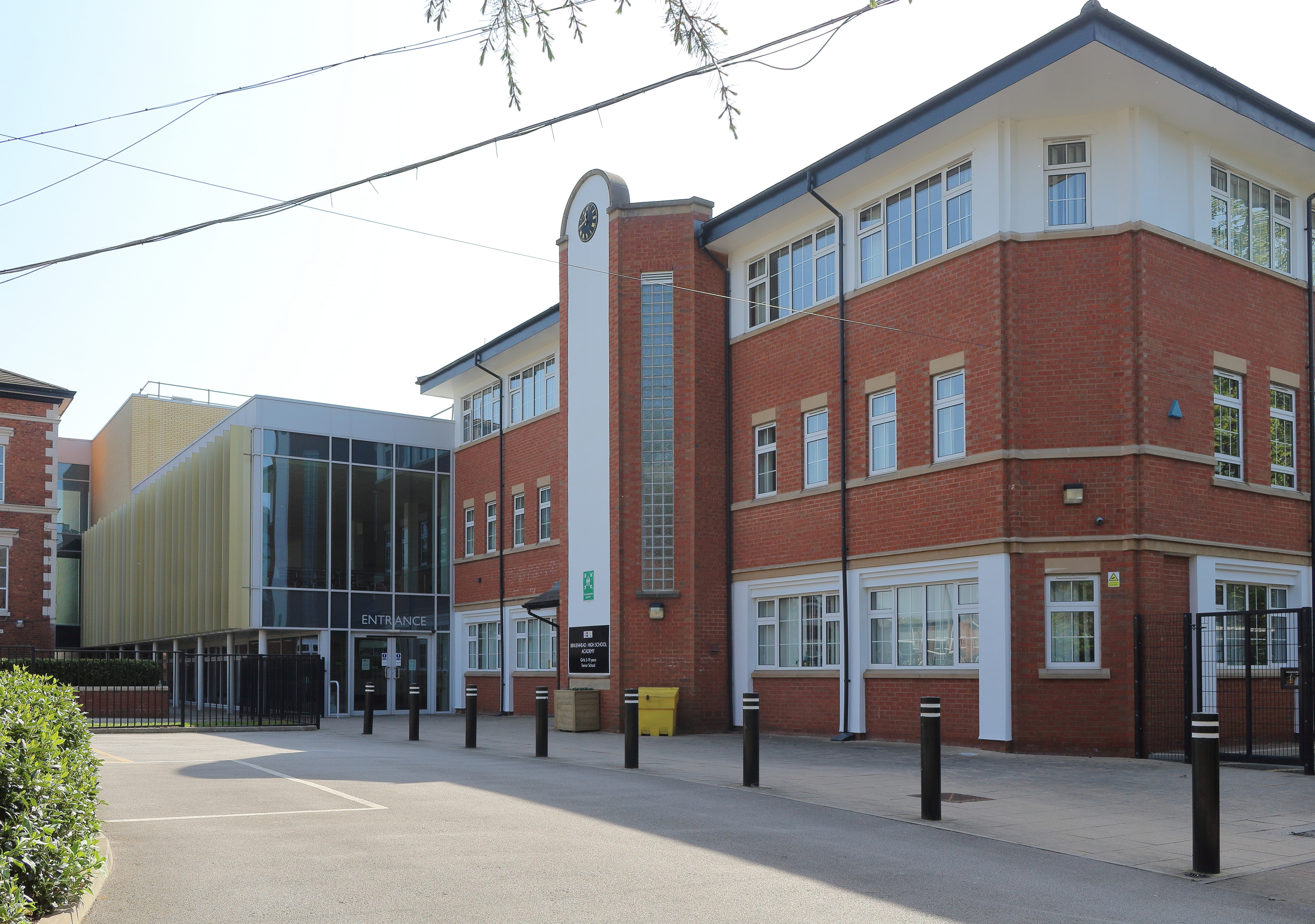
Senior school

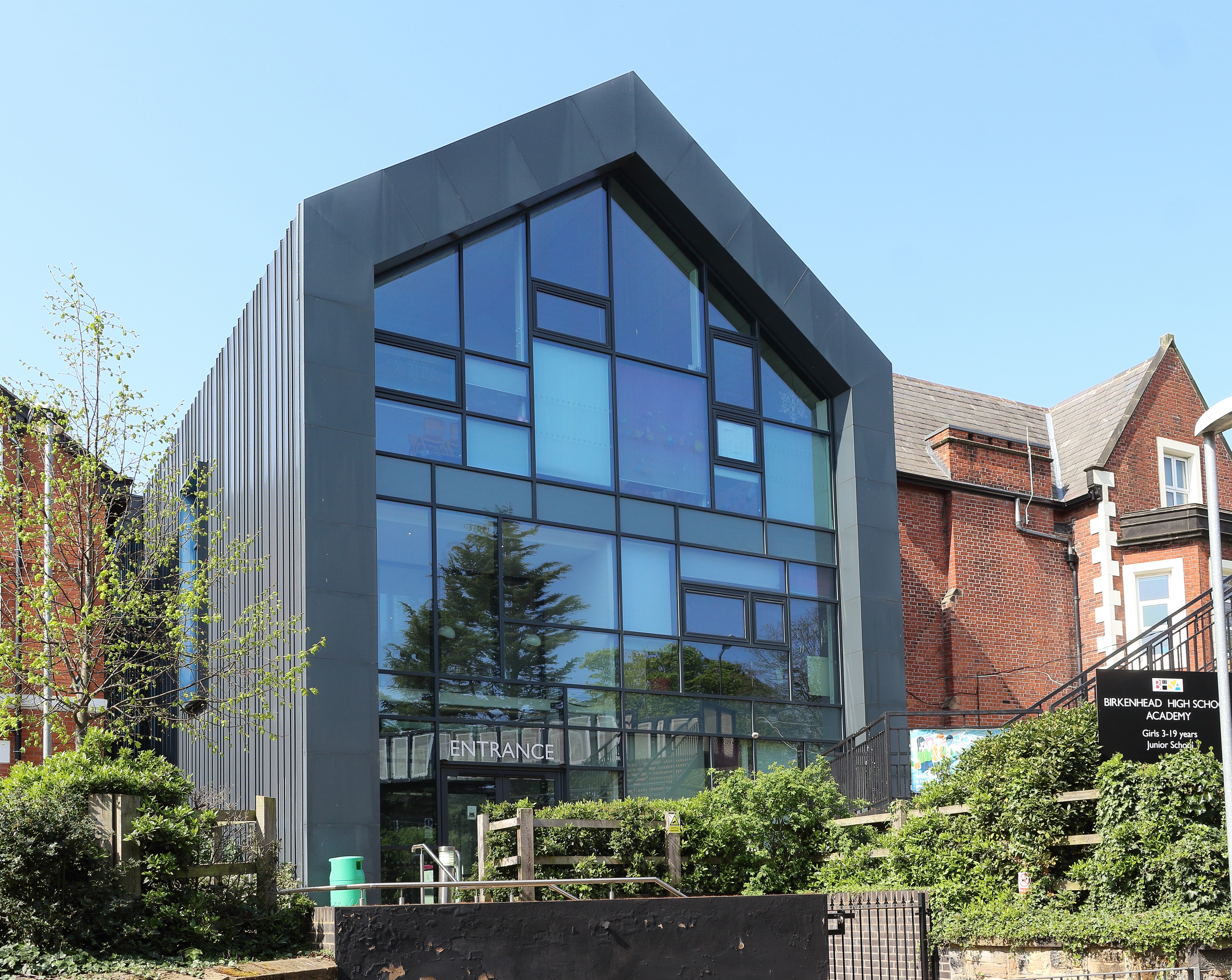
New junior school building

== Local response to Academy decision ==
In response to the school's decision to become a state-funded all-ability Academy, and the consequent abandonment of the planned merger between the schools which had been actually initiated by Birkenhead High School, the neighbouring Birkenhead School became fully co-educational in September 2008, stating that it had "the desire to play our role in providing a selective and independent choice for all children on Wirral, whether boys or girls". Subsequently, it has completed a £2m investment to support its co-educational future and deal with increased numbers. Currently around 28% of its pupils are girls, with its initial intake primarily from Birkenhead High School Academy.

== Academic Performance and the Impact of Academy Status ==
In 2009, the last year of Birkenhead High School as an independent selective school, it achieved the best A level results in Wirral, measured as points per entry, together with Birkenhead School, a co-educational independent selective school.

In 2011, Birkenhead High School Academy received national recognition for the proportion of top grades achieved by its pupils in the GCSE examinations. It qualified as one of the top 10% of non-selective schools in England, where at least 19% of students gained 5A*-A grades, including English and Maths, proving itself to be one of the best schools in the country.

== Notable former pupils ==
- Ann Bell, actress
- Professor Jane Guyer, nee Mason, professor of anthropology and director of undergraduate studies, Johns Hopkins University, Baltimore, Maryland, US.
- Nicola Horlick, fund manager
- Penny Hughes, businesswoman
- Marian Lines, actress and writer
- Dame Mary Marsh, chief executive from 2000–8 of the NSPCC
- Dame Patricia Routledge CBE, actress.
- Dr Sheila Shribman, doctor, national clinical director for children.
- Charlotte Voake, children's author and illustrator
- Dame Frances Yates OBE, historian.
- Sam Quek- England Hockey Player and Gold Medalist at Rio
