= Listed buildings in Oxton, Merseyside =

Oxton is a suburb of Birkenhead, Wirral, Merseyside, England. It contains 28 buildings that are recorded in the National Heritage List for England as designated listed buildings. Of these, one is listed at Grade II*, the middle of the three grades, and the others are at Grade II, the lowest grade. The area is residential, and the listed buildings consist of houses, dating mainly from the 18th century, a school, a gateway, and three churches.

== Key ==
Grade	Criteria
II*	Particularly important buildings of more than special interest
II	Buildings of national importance and special interest

== Buildings ==
Name and location	Photograph	Date	Notes	Grade
Oxton Old Hall; 53.38105°N 3.05104°W	—	c. 1660	A small stone house with a tiled roof. It has two storeys and two bays, with a later parallel gabled wing. The doorway has a gabled porch, and the windows are mullioned.	II
14 Fairview Road; 53.37956°N 3.03942°W	—	c. 1840	A stone house with a Welsh slate roof in two storeys. Originally in two-bays, an additional bay was later added to the left. The doorway has a latticed porch with a lead canopy, and most of the windows are sashes.	II
16 Fairview Road; 53.37947°N 3.03940°W	—	c. 1840	A stone house with a Welsh slate roof. It has two storeys and a two-bay front, with a projecting wing on the right. The central doorway has a rendered architrave, and the windows are sashes.	II
17 Fairview Road; 53.38023°N 3.04047°W	—	c. 1840	A stuccoed house with a hipped Welsh slate roof in two storeys. The central doorway has an architrave with fluted Ionic pilasters, and a traceried fanlight. To the left of it is a square bay window and to the right is a canted bay window.	II
11 and 13 South Bank; 53.37789°N 3.04127°W	—	c. 1840	A pair of roughcast houses with a Welsh slate roof. They are symmetrical with two storeys, and each house has two bays. The outer bays project forward, they are gabled, and each floor contains a cast iron traceried arched window. The inner bays contain a door with a lozenge fanlight.	II
2 and 4 Willan Street, 3 Village Road; 53.38173°N 3.04462°W		c. 1840–47	A terrace of three roughcast houses with stuccoed dressings and a Welsh slate roof. They have two storeys and each house has a three-bay front. The central doors have fanlights and panelled surrounds, and above each doorway is a blind window. The other windows are sashes.	II
Holly Lodge; 53.38162°N 3.04850°W	—	c. 1840–47	A stuccoed house with a Welsh slate roof in Gothic style. It has two storeys and an asymmetrical front of three bays. The central and right bays project forward, and are gabled with finials, the right bay being the larger. This has a canted bay window with an embattled parapet above. The other windows are mullioned and transomed.	II
Christ Church; 53.38312°N 3.04009°W		1844–49	The church was designed by William Jearrad, and is built in stone with Welsh slate roofs. It consists of a nave, transepts, a chancel with aisles, and a west steeple. The steeple has a two-stage tower with a west door and a clock face. On the tower is a broach spire with lucarnes. The windows are lancets.	II
Trinity With Palm Grove United Reformed Church, Oxton; 53.38618°N 3.05008°W		1865–66	Originally a Presbyterian church by W. and J. Hay, it is built in stone with Welsh slate roofs. The church consists of a nave with aisles, and a west steeple. There is a hall complex to the east and south. The steeple consists of a tower with a stair turret and gables cutting into the spire. On the corners are pinnacles, and the spire contains lucarnes. Some windows are lancets, and others have Decorated tracery.	II
5 and 7 Alton Road; 53.38242°N 3.04701°W	—	c. 1850	A pair of roughcast houses with a Welsh slate roof. They have two storeys, and are symmetrical, each house having two bays. Each outer bay contains a canted bay window. The doorways are on the sides, and the windows are sashes.	II
9 and 11 Alton Road; 53.38258°N 3.04712°W	—	c. 1850	A pair of roughcast houses with a Welsh slate roof. They have two storeys, and are symmetrical, each house having two bays. The outer bays project forward, they are gabled, and each contains a canted bay window. The doorways are on the sides, and the windows are sashes.	II
13 and 15 Alton Road; 53.38275°N 3.04722°W	—	c. 1850	A pair of roughcast houses with a Welsh slate roof. They have two storeys, and are symmetrical, each house having two bays. Each outer bay contains a canted bay window. The doorways are on the sides, and the windows are sashes.	II
14 Arno Road; 53.37902°N 3.03922°W	—	c. 1850	A brick house with a hipped Welsh slate roof. It has two storeys and a two-bay front with a central entrance. The doorway has a plain architrave and a fanlight, and there is a canted bay window to the left. The windows are sashes.	II
20 Fairview Road; 53.37902°N 3.03943°W	—	c. 1850	A brick house with stone dressings and a Welsh slate roof. It has two storeys and a two-bay front. The central doorway has a latticed porch, and the windows are sashes.	II
3, 5 and 7 South Bank; 53.37795°N 3.04041°W	—	c. 1850	A row of three roughcast houses with a Welsh slate roof. They have two storeys and a symmetrical five-bay front. The outer and central bays project forward and are gabled with fretted bargeboards and finials. On the sides of the outer bays are square bay windows. Most of the windows are casements.	II
20 Talbot Road; 53.37762°N 3.04994°W	—	c. 1850	A brick house with stuccoed dressings and a Welsh slate roof. It has 2 1/2 storeys and a three-bay front with a wing at the rear. In the centre is a semicircular porch with Tuscan columns and a door with a fanlight. To the left is a blind windows with a moulded keystone, and to the right is a three-light window with margin windows. The other windows are sashes; those in the middle storey having entablatures and moulded brackets, the central window being pedimented. The top floor windows have moulded architraves.	II
14 and 16 Village Road; 53.38223°N 3.04407°W	—	c. 1850	A pair of stuccoed houses with a Welsh slate roof. They are in two storeys and have a symmetrical front with the outer gabled bays projecting forward. Each of these bays contains a square bay window with a parapet. Between the outer bays is a Regency cast iron verandah. The windows are sashes.	II
18 Village Road; 53.38221°N 3.04433°W	—	c. 1850	A stuccoed house with a Welsh slate roof. It is in two storeys and has two main bays with a recessed bay to the right forming a porch containing a round-arched entrance. The right main bay has a full-height polygonal bay window. The windows are sashes.	II
20, 22 and 24 Village Road; 53.38215°N 3.04478°W	—	c. 1850	A terrace of three stuccoed houses with a Welsh slate roof. They have 2 1/2 storeys and a symmetrical front, the outer bays projecting forward. Between the bays is a ground floor arcade forming a loggia. Between the floors are a modillion cornices. The windows are casements, and above the doors are fanlights.	II
20 and 22 Rosemount; 53.37982°N 3.04592°W	—	c. 1850–58	A pair of stuccoed houses with a hipped Welsh slate roof. They have two storeys and a four-bay front, with entrances on the sides. The windows are sashes with mullions and transoms. The first floor windows have panelled aprons and segmental pediments.	II
41 Rosemount, 2 Roslin Road; 53.38039°N 3.04451°W	—	c. 1850–58	A pair of stuccoed houses with a Welsh slate roof in Italianate style. They have two storeys and a symmetrical plan. Each house is in three bays, the outer bay recessed and containing a round-arched doorway. The bays project forward under a pediment, and they contain a canted bay window. The inner bays contain French windows, and the other windows are casements.	II
Pillar box, Ball's Road; 53.38452°N 3.03980°W		c. 1856	The pillar box is in cast iron, and consists of a circular column with 16 flutes. It stands on a moulded base, and at the top is a band, a cornice and a shallow conical cap. The band is inscribed with "POST OFFICE" and the royal cypher "VR".	II
30 Shrewsbury Road; 53.38354°N 3.04691°W		c. 1860	One of a pair of brick houses with stone dressings and a tiled roof. It has two storeys, and is in two bays with a recessed entrance block to the right. The doorway has a segmental head, voussoirs, and a fanlight. The right bay projects forward, is gabled, and contains a canted bay window with a balustraded parapet. The windows are sashes. In 1902 Charles Voysey remodelled four rooms and designed their furniture.	II
Pillar box, Alton Road; 53.38423°N 3.04803°W		1866–71	A pillar box designed by John Penfold. It is in cast iron, and is hexagonal with a moulded base, bands and a cornice. The pillar box has an ogival top with an acorn finial.	II
Gateway, wall and tower, Christchurch Road; 53.38313°N 3.04086°W	—	c. 1870	The structure is in sandstone. The wall joins a small turret with an archway on the left to another turret on the right on which is a recessed round tower. The turrets and tower are embattled and each has a parapet overhanging a dog-tooth cornice.	II
Preparatory Department, Birkenhead School; 53.38544°N 3.05326°W		c. 1871	The school was designed by Charles Lucy and completed by Walter Scott. It was extended, including a headmaster's house, in 1878. The chapel was added in 1882–83, designed by F. W. Hornblower and Charles Harrison Townsend, a former pupil. The school is in brick with stone dressings and a roof of Welsh slate and tiles.	II
8 Silverdale Road (Ron's Place); 53.38396°N 3.05129°W	—	Late 19th century	A semi-detached house that has been divided into four flats, it is in orange brick with stone dressings and a roof of orange tiles. There are two storeys and an attic. The interior of the ground floor has been created by Ron Gittins into an example of large-scale Outsider art. The interior of each room is decorated in a different theme, including Egyptian, Roman, Greek, naval and aquatic themes.	II
37 Bidston Road; 53.38485°N 3.05759°W		c. 1880	A brick house with a Welsh slate roof, in two storeys and an attic, and with a three-bay asymmetrical front. The central bay projects forward and is gabled, and to the right is a canted bay window. To the right of this is a recessed porch, and the windows are sashes. On the ridge are cresting and finials. Inside many of the fittings are by Charles Voysey.	II
59 Shrewsbury Road; 53.38643°N 3.05393°W		c. 1884	A brick house with some applied timberwork and a tiled roof, designed by George Smith in Elizabethan style. It is mainly in two storeys, and has three main bays with a recessed service wing to the right. The central bay projects forward, has three storeys, contains a doorway, and is gabled. The windows are mullioned or mullioned and transomed.	II
St Saviour's Church; 53.38227°N 3.05175°W		1889–92	Designed by C. W. Harvey with Pennington and Bridgen in Decorated style, the church is in sandstone with a Welsh slate roof. It has a cruciform plan, consisting of a nave with a clerestory, aisles, a south porch, transepts, a tower at the crossing, and a chancel. The tower has two stages above the crossing, and angle buttresses that rise to pinnacles.	II*
Church of the Holy Name of Jesus; 53.38460°N 3.05557°W		1898–99	A Roman Catholic church by Edmund Kirby in Gothic Revival style. A porch, baptistry, Lady chapel, and sacristy were added in 1909. The church is built in brick with moulded brick dressings and tiled roofs, and is orientated north-south. It consists of a nave, a polygonal sanctuary, a porch and baptistry at the liturgical west, a north Lady chapel and a south sacristy. The west face is gabled and contains a rose window.	II
