= Khadambi Asalache =

Kenyan writer (1935–2006)

- Born: 27 February 1935; Kaimosi, Kenya
- Died: 26 May 2006 (aged 71); London, England
- Other name: Nathaniel Asalache
- Education: Mang'u High School; Royal Technical College; Birkbeck College
- Occupations: Poet, author and civil servant
- Known for: 575 Wandsworth Road
- Partner: Susie Thomson

Khadambi Asalache (28 February 1935 – 26 May 2006) was a Kenyan poet and author who settled in London, England. He was later a civil servant at HM Treasury. He left his lavishly decorated South London terraced house, 575 Wandsworth Road, to the National Trust.

== Early life ==
Asalache was born in Kaimosi in western Kenya, the eldest child of the local chief. In his youth, Asalache read Shakespeare while herding cattle. He was educated at Mang'u High School, run by the Holy Ghost Fathers, where he was given the Christian name Nathaniel, and then studied architecture at the Royal Technical College in Nairobi (later to become the University of Nairobi).

After studying fine art in Rome, Geneva and Vienna, he moved to London in 1960, where he taught Swahili at the Berlitz School, and worked for the BBC African Service. Despite his international work, Asalache maintained a close connection with his community in Kenya.

== Writing career ==
He was a pioneer of modern Kenyan literature in English, with his first novel, The Calabash of Life, being published in 1967 by Longman. The novel focused on Kenyan tribesmen opposing a usurper and quickly became an international success; it went into ten editions worldwide and, according to The Times, "was on the syllabus of many schools in Africa, putting Asalache among the most serious writers in the burst of East African novels in English in the 1960s and 1970s."

In the 1970s, he served on the council of management of the Africa Centre in London. He also wrote and produced an episode of the BBC series Danger Man. Extracts from his second novel, The Latecomer, with animal characters, were broadcast by the BBC African Service in January 1971.

Asalache's writing was published in the literary journals African Arts, Transition and Présence Africaine. A collection of his poems, Sunset in Naivasha, was published by Eothen Books in 1973. His poem "Death of a Chief" was included in the Penguin Book of Modern African Poetry in 1995; following Asalache's death, the poem was read during the BBC Radio 4 programme Last Word by Burt Caesar.

Asalache received an MPhil degree in philosophy of mathematics from Birkbeck College in the 1970s, and became a civil servant at the Treasury.

== 575 Wandsworth Road ==
Buying a modest "two-up two-down" Georgian terraced house in London's Wandsworth Road in 1981, Asalache paid less than the asking price of £31,000. 575 Wandsworth Road was in Lambeth on the number 77 bus route, allowing him to commute almost direct to his workplace. The property was in a poor state of repair when he bought it, having previously been occupied by squatters. He began working on it initially as a measure to counter damp patches. For 20 years, he decorated it internally with Moorish-influenced fretwork that he cut by hand from discarded pine doors and wooden boxes. The intricate woodwork was augmented by illustrations of African wilderness, and his collection of 19th-century English lustreware pottery.

The house was shown in The World of Interiors in July/August 1990, and the Sunday Telegraph Magazine in February 2000. Tim Knox, director of Sir John Soane's Museum, wrote about the house in Nest in late 2003, describing it as an extremely serious and carefully worked out exercise taking its inspiration from the Mozarabic reticulations of the Moorish kingdoms of Granada. The work also takes inspiration from the Great Mosque of Cordoba, the Alhambra and Generalife in Granada, doors in Zanzibar, panelled interiors in Damascus, the waterside houses or yalı in Istanbul, and the architecture seen on Lamu Island in his home country of Kenya.

According to Elsie Owusu, founding chair of the Society of Black Architects, the house "could be described as an embodiment of the social, political and artistic history of the British colonial experience in the 20th Century."

Asalache's fretwork flows freely from one style to another, and by continuously changing the pattern he said it keeps your mind working. He observed that in nature there is a balance and harmony but no symmetry, and the fretwork has a gentle asymmetry, which he preferred.

== Personal life, death and legacy ==
Asalache met his partner, Scottish basket-maker Susie Thomson, in 1989. He was an accomplished chef for their dinner parties, importing dried tuna that was flown in from Mombasa.

Although a non-smoker, he died of lung cancer in 2006 and was survived by Susie Thomson. He left 575 Wandsworth Road to the National Trust in his will. The National Trust accepted the property, deciding that it was "of national significance and should be safeguarded ... a great work of art and an important part of our built heritage", subject to raising an endowment of £3m to £5m for its maintenance.

Following a two-year restoration, the house first opened to the public in 2013. The National Trust obtained museum status for 575 Wandsworth Road in 2019.
