= 575 Wandsworth Road =

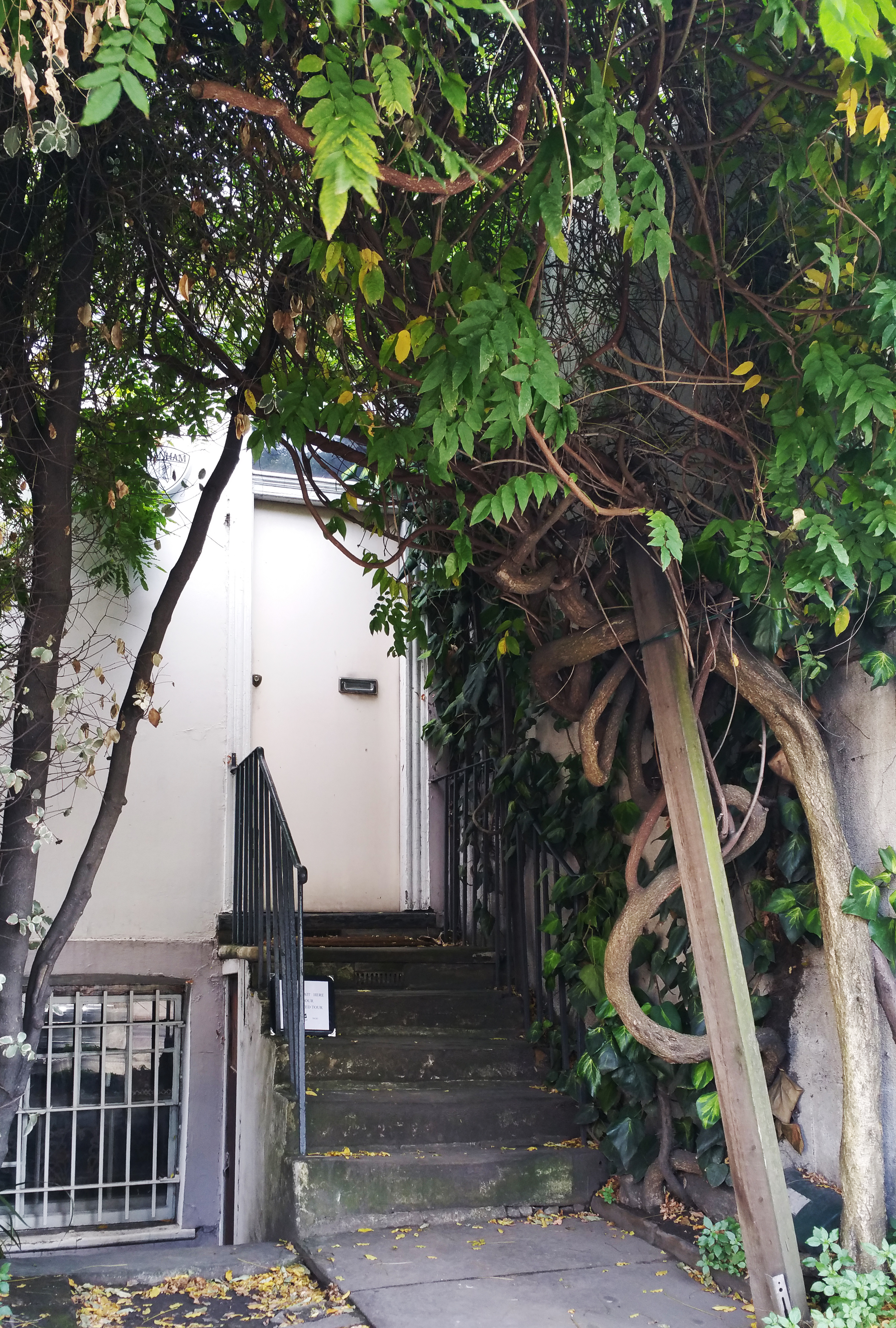
- Entrance to 575 Wandsworth Road

- Location within London Borough of Lambeth

General information
- Type: Georgian terraced house
- Location: Clapham; London, SW8; United Kingdom
- Coordinates: 51.469671°N 0.140646°W
- Owner: National Trust

Website
- www.nationaltrust.org.uk/575-wandsworth-road

575 Wandsworth Road, London, was the home of Kenyan poet and civil servant Khadambi Asalache until his death in 2006. Following his death he left it to the National Trust, which opened the house as a museum for pre-booked guided tours.

== History ==
Asalache bought the two-up two-down Georgian terraced house in Wandsworth Road in 1981, paying less than the asking price of £31,000. The property was in a poor state of repair when he bought it, having previously been occupied by squatters. For 20 years, he decorated it internally with Moorish-influenced fretwork, which he cut by hand from discarded pine doors and wooden boxes. The intricate woodwork was augmented by illustrations of African wilderness, and his collection of 19th-century English lustreware.

The property was shown in World of Interiors in 1990, and in the Sunday Telegraph Magazine in 2000. Tim Knox, director of Sir John Soane's Museum, in Nest in 2003, described it as:

extremely serious and carefully worked out exercise in horror vacui, taking its inspiration from the Mozarabic reticulations of the Moorish kingdoms of Granada.

The work takes inspiration from the Great Mosque of Cordoba, the Alhambra and Generalife in Granada, doors in Zanzibar, panelled interiors in Damascus, and the waterside houses or yalı in Istanbul. Asalache left the property to the National Trust in his will. They accepted the property, subject to raising an endowment of £3–5 million for its maintenance, as they considered it a building:

of national significance and should be safeguarded ... a great work of art and an important part of our built heritage,

The house was grade II listed in 1974, along with its neighbour, number 573, but as of 2025 the NHLE record, last amended in 1981, makes no mention of the interior.

== Visiting ==
Following major conservation work, in 2013 the National Trust began pre-booked guided tours of the house. These have proved "very popular".

== See also ==
- David Parr House
- Ron's Place
