= Charles Whittle =

Charles Whittle may refer to:

- Charles Whittle (cricketer)
- Charles Whittle (entertainer)
