= Penny Hughes =

British businesswoman (born 1959)

- Born: Penelope Lesley Hughes; 1959 (age 65–66); West Kirby, Cheshire, (Note: West Kirby was part of Cheshire in 1959. It later became part of Merseyside upon the county’s establishment in 1974.) England
- Education: Birkenhead High School
- Alma mater: University of Sheffield (BA)
- Occupation: Businesswoman
- Title: Chair, IQ Student Accommodation
- Children: 2 sons

Penny Hughes CBE (born 1959) is a British businesswoman, and the chair of IQ Student Accommodation. She is the former chair of Aston Martin and The Gym Group.

== Early life ==
Hughes was born in West Kirby, the youngest of three daughters in a middle-class family.

Hughes was educated at Birkenhead High School. While at the school she represented the county at hockey and lacrosse. She earned a bachelor's degree in chemistry from the University of Sheffield in 1980.

== Career ==
She joined Procter & Gamble, as a technologist, then moved to the sales and marketing department. She was then recruited by the Milk Marketing Board, and later joined Coca-Cola as a brand manager. By 1989, having successfully overseen the merger of the bottling interests of Coca-Cola UK and Schweppes, she was appointed commercial director. In 1993, at the age of 33 she became president of the UK and Ireland businesses of Coca-Cola.

She has been a director of the Bodyshop, GAP, Trinity Mirror, Next, Skandinaviska Enskilda Banken, Vodafone and Reuters. She was a non-executive director of the Royal Bank of Scotland Group between 2010 and 2018 and a member of the boards remuneration committee. She is a non-executive director of Morrisons, Cable & Wireless and Home Retail Group. She is a trustee of the British Museum and president of the Advertising Association.

In February 2018, Hughes was appointed as the chair of IQ Student Accommodation, the UK's largest provider of student housing.

In September 2018, Hughes was appointed as the chair of Aston Martin. In January 2020 it was announced that Canadian billionaire Lawrence Stroll would replace Hughes as chairman after purchasing a 25% stake in the company.

In July 2022, Hughes stepped down as chair of The Gym Group.

== Honours ==
She was appointed Commander of the Order of the British Empire (CBE) in the 2011 Birthday Honours for services to the media industry.

== Personal life ==
She has two sons.
