= Mary Marsh =

Dame Mary Marsh DBE
- Born: Mary Elizabeth Falconer; 17 August 1946 (age 80)
- Education: Birkenhead High School
- Alma mater: University of Nottingham; Hatfield Polytechnic; London Business School.
- Occupations: Activist, academic
- Board member of: HSBC
- Children: 4

Dame Mary Elizabeth Marsh DBE FRSA (née Falconer; born 17 August 1946) is non-executive director of HSBC Bank plc and member of the governing body at London Business School. She is chair of the Royal College of Paediatrics and Child Health (RCPCH) board of trustees.

== Early life ==
Marsh is the daughter of George Donald Falconer and his wife, Lesley Mary Wilson. She attended Birkenhead High School and then the University of Nottingham, where she graduated with a BSc in Geography. She later obtained a DipEd from Hatfield Polytechnic, and an MBA from the London Business School.

== Career ==
She started her career as a geography teacher at Luton Comprehensive School, and then became deputy head of St Christopher School in Letchworth. She was appointed head teacher of Queens' School in Hertfordshire, and moved to Holland Park School in 1995. She was the founding director of the Clore Social Leadership Programme from 2008 to 2015, and the chief executive of the National Society for the Prevention of Cruelty to Children (NSPCC) from 2000 to 2008.

== Honours ==
She was decorated as a DBE by HM The Queen in the 2007 New Year Honours list for "services to families and children".

== Personal life ==
A widow, Marsh has four sons and lives in London.
