= IQ Student Accommodation =

British property rental company

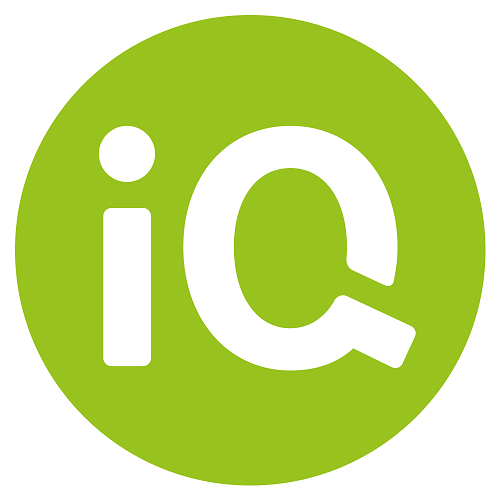
iQ company logo

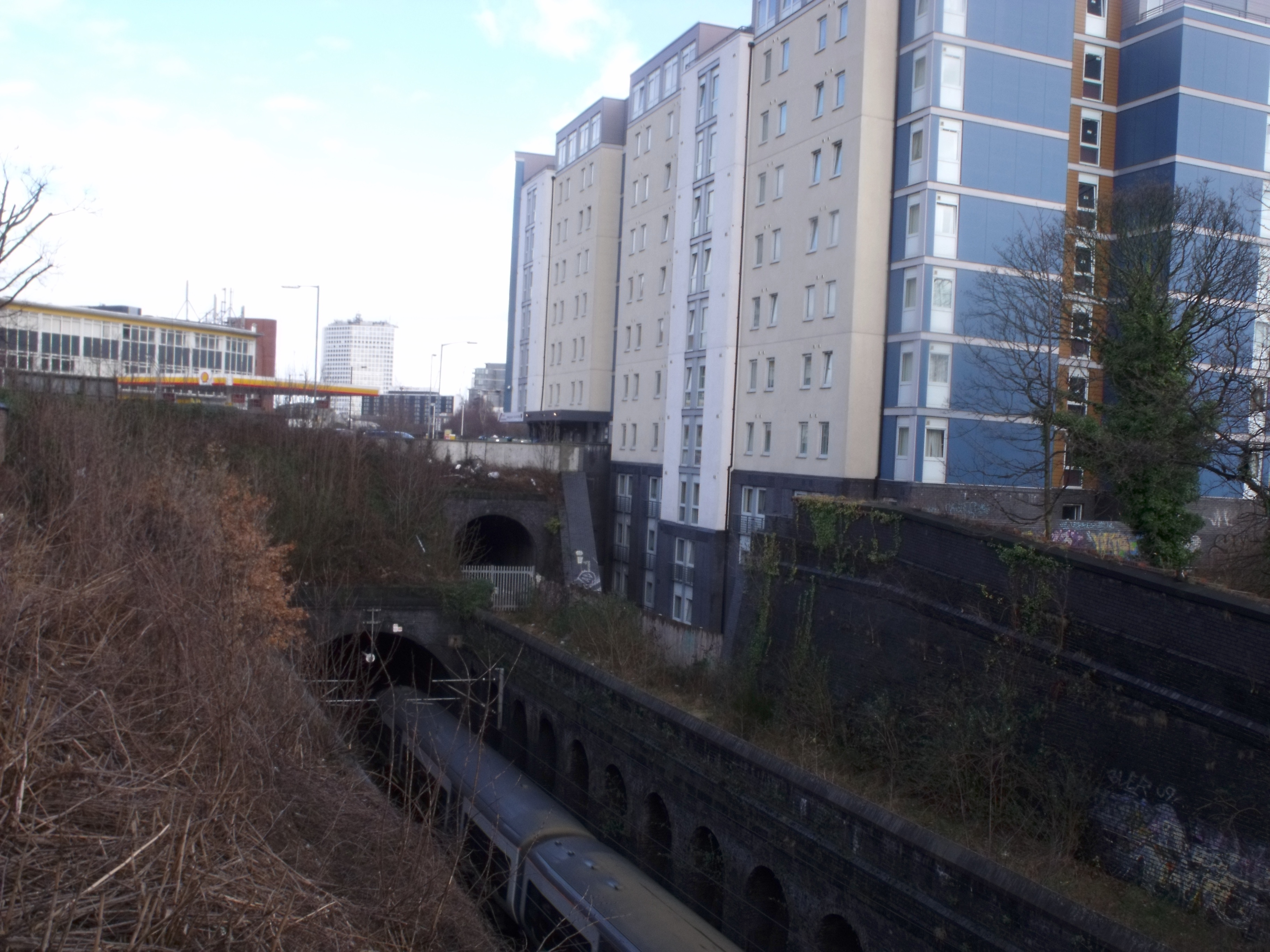
Broderick House, Birmingham, an IQ student building

IQ Student Accommodation is a UK-based provider of student housing, offering modern, all-inclusive student accommodation in major university cities such as London, Manchester, and Edinburgh. It is owned by Blackstone, one of the world's largest real estate investment firms.

== History ==
In 2016, the Wellcome Trust merged its student accommodation business with Prodigy Living, owned by Goldman Sachs and Greystar Real Estate Partners, thereby founding the company.

In December 2017, IQ Student Accommodation bought Pure Student Living from LetterOne Treasury Services for £869 million, adding 11 sites in London, Edinburgh, York, Bath and Brighton.

As of February 2018, IQ owned 66 student halls, with 28,000 bedrooms, and a valuation of about £3 billion. IQ is the UK's largest provider of purpose-built student accommodation by value, and second largest by number of bedrooms (after Unite Students). IQ has the largest London portfolio, with 6,700 rooms in 15 sites.

In February 2018, Penny Hughes was appointed as chair, joining Rob Roger who was the chief executive (CEO).

In June 2019, it was announced that IQ Student Accommodation was planning to build a cohabitation development in Manchester, not specifically aimed at students. This would be the first development of this kind in Manchester.

In February 2020, Blackstone announced plans to purchase the company for £4.66 billion, in the UK's largest ever private real estate transaction. The deal completed on 15 May 2020.

During April 2023, IQ purchased a 522-bed student accommodation in Nottingham from the Jensco Group for £68.12m (€77.4m).
