= Oxton, Merseyside =

Coordinates: 53.3807°N 3.0483°W

Oxton
- Village
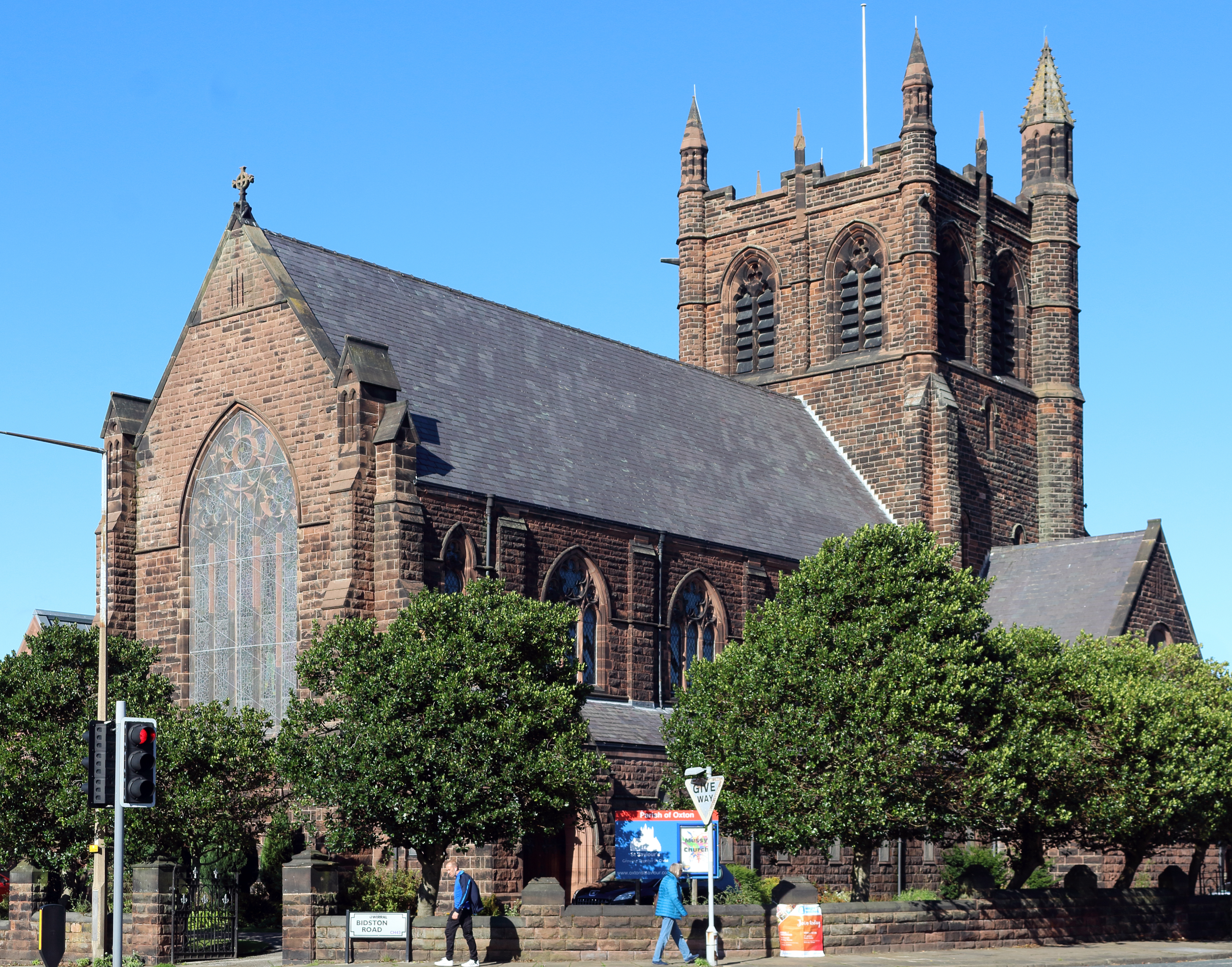
- St. Saviour's Church, Bidston Road

- Location within Merseyside
- Population: 14,232 (2011 Census.Ward)
- OS grid reference: SJ303876
  - London: 178 mi (286 km) SE
- Metropolitan borough: Wirral
- Metropolitan county: Merseyside
- Region: North West
- Country: England
- Sovereign state: United Kingdom
- Post town: BIRKENHEAD
- Postcode district: CH42
- Post town: PRENTON
- Postcode district: CH43
- Dialling code: 0151
- ISO 3166 code: GB-WRL
- Police: Merseyside
- Fire: Merseyside
- Ambulance: North West
- UK Parliament: Birkenhead

Oxton is a suburb of Birkenhead, Merseyside, England. Administratively it is a ward of the Metropolitan Borough of Wirral. Originally a village in its own right, it became part of the Municipal Borough of Birkenhead upon its creation in 1877. Before local government reorganisation on 1 April 1974, it was part of the County Borough of Birkenhead, within the county of Cheshire.

== History ==
The name Oxa-tún derives from Old Norse, meaning "a farm or enclosure where oxen are kept". By 1278, the name had been adapted into Old English as Oxeton and was recorded as Oxon in 1549.

Oxton was once one of the most affluent areas in England mainly due to its proximity to Liverpool and the fact that along with various other Wirral locations, it was a favourite residential area for wealthy Liverpool merchants and tradesmen of the time. Oxton Village is a mainly early Victorian era settlement with fine sandstone and brick built houses, many of which now form part of a conservation area designated in April 1979 and administered by the Metropolitan Borough of Wirral. Some of these buildings have been designated by English Heritage as Grade II listed.

A significant part of the land on which Oxton is situated was part of the Estate of the Earl of Shrewsbury. This has been commemorated over the years in many of the road names, which bear the family names and titles of the various Earls: Alton Road, Beresford Road, Chetwynd Road, Ingestre Road, Shrewsbury Road, Talbot Road, Waterford Road and Wexford Road. The oldest pub in Oxton Village is called the Shrewsbury Arms and the bar which is now known as the Oxton Bar and Kitchen was formerly the Talbot Hotel.

Christ Church opened in 1849 and has a Father Willis organ, installed in 1888.

== Geography ==
=== Location ===
The Wirral peninsula is formed of Triassic Keuper and Bunter sandstones covered by glacially deposited boulder clay. The historic settlement of Oxon-hill laid to the north-eastern side of the peninsula on the sandstone ridge near to current location of St Saviours Church and the Caernarfon Castle public house

Oxton Village pre-dates the conurbation that developed around Birkenhead, of which it now forms part. It is bordered to the north by Claughton and to the south by Prenton. Birkenhead town centre lies to the east.

Originally an agricultural community, Oxton became a desirable residential location for the middle classes and bourgeoisie as the economy of 19th century Birkenhead and Liverpool grew. The north east of the conservation area, at the junction of Victoria Mount, Rose Mount, Village Road and Claughton Firs developed as a commercial centre with restaurants, pubs, cafes and shops.

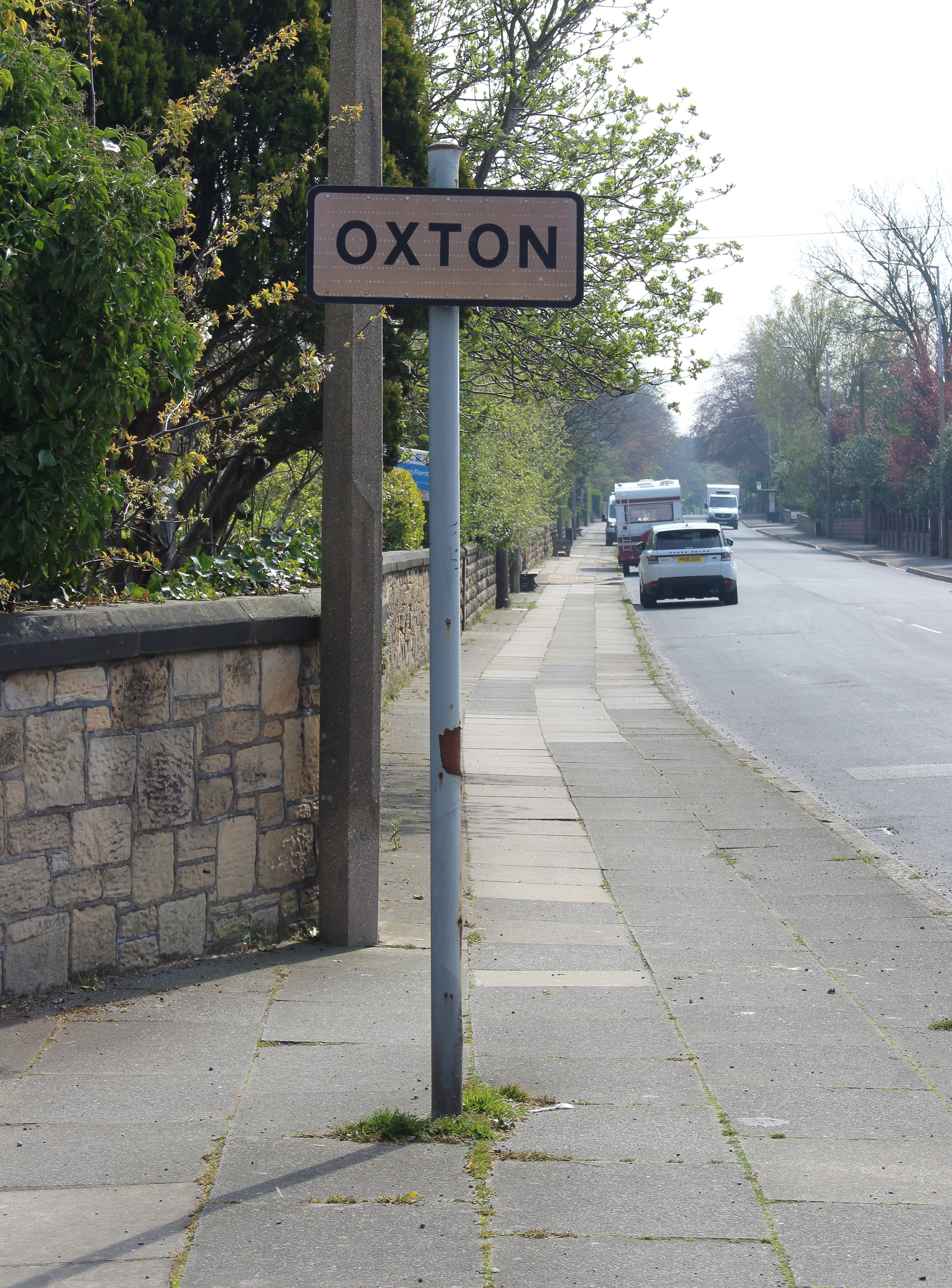
Sign for Oxton opposite Wirral Golf Club.

=== Conservation Area and Oxton Village ===
Oxton Village Conservation Area was established in 1979 by Wirral Borough Council in order to "preserve and enhance the village's distinctive character". Soon afterwards, a registered charity was founded to promote the Conservation Area; this was named The Oxton Society. This objective of this charity is to work in partnership with the council, local businesses and the community to pursue this objective.

The approximate boundary is bounded by Shrewsbury Road to the north, Fairview Road to the east, Arno Road to the south and Talbot Road to the west. Irregular in places, the boundary has a number of ‘pockets' encompassing small groups of properties or parts of streets. In 2010 Wirral Council commissioned an appraisal for Oxton Village Conservation Areas that evaluated and analysed various features which gives the conservation area its special architectural and historic interest. The appraisal made recommendations to extend the Conservation Area boundaries of Normanston Road & Derwent Road, Birch Road, Village Road & Wellington Road and Talbot Road, Mill Hill and Ingestre Road. The consultation period for the boundary extensions has now closed and the extensions are in the process of being adopted.

=== Post town controversy ===
Owing to a redefining of post towns by the Royal Mail in 2003, Oxton is partially identified as being within Prenton. However, whilst this was only a postal address, in its 22 May 2003 edition, the Liverpool Echo reported that "Jeremy Watson, of the Oxton Society, has called on the Royal Mail to have a ballot"; however, the code at that time did not allow a request to ballot. A similar complaint was made on behalf of Prenton residents when the Royal Mail defined part of Prenton to be within Oxton.

== Education ==
Independent and selective Birkenhead School was exclusively a boys' school from its founding in 1860 until 2000, when its Sixth Form became co-educational. It became fully co-educational in 2008. Birkenhead High School was formerly an independent selective school for girls but became a state-funded all-ability Academy school in 2009. Both changes were driven by falling numbers of pupils in the schools as a result of the abolition of the Assisted Places Scheme. Despite this, both schools maintain their place around the top of the Wirral A Level results.

In addition Prenton Preparatory School lies in the heart of the Conservation Area and Oxton St Saviour's is the local primary school. A number of other schools lie just outside the boundary of Oxton, including St. Anselm's College (boys, RC) and Townfield Primary School.

== Sport ==
Oxton Cricket & Sports Club is also located here. Founded in 1875 as Oxton Cricket Club, other sports played at the club include tennis, lacrosse, squash and bowls.

== Demographics ==
At the 2001 Census, the population of Oxton was 14,066, consisting of 6,680 males and 7,386 females.

Some 2005 demographic statistics of area CH43, which encompasses the geographical area of Oxton, Claughton and parts of Bidston and Noctorum, (total CH43 population (2005): 36,443) are:

Median Age	39
% Retirees	21.9%
% Unemployed	4.4%
Total Migrants	3,497
% Total Migrants	9.6%
Average distance travelled to fixed place of work	12 km

== Governance ==
Oxton is part of the Birkenhead parliamentary constituency.

=== Local Councillors ===
After reorganisation in 2004, Oxton forms an electoral ward of the Metropolitan Borough of Wirral, which had an electorate of 11,237 on 6 May 2010.

Metropolitan Borough of Wirral: Oxton Ward
Councillor	Party
Stuart Kelly	Liberal Democrat
Allan Brame	Liberal Democrat
Andy Corkhill	Liberal Democrat

=== 2019 local elections ===
The results of the Local Election Result for Oxton ward on 2 May 2019 were:

https://democracy.wirral.gov.uk/mgElectionAreaResults.aspx?XXR=0&ID=67&RPID=508567813

=== Administrative history ===
Oxton was historically a township and chapelry in the ancient parish of Woodchurch in the Wirral Hundred of Cheshire. Part of the township was administratively absorbed into Birkenhead in 1843 when it was added to the improvement commissioners' district which covered the town.

The rest of the township was made a local government district in 1863, governed by a local board. In 1866 Oxton became a separate civil parish. The local government district was abolished in 1877 and its area was incorporated into the new municipal borough of Birkenhead. Oxton continued to be a civil parish within the borough until 31 March 1898 when all the parishes within the borough were merged into a single parish named "Birkenhead St Mary" or "Birkenhead". In 1891 the parish had a population of 4429. The borough of Birkenhead was abolished in 1974, becoming part of the metropolitan borough of Wirral in the new county of Merseyside.

== Notable connections ==
- Patrick Abercrombie (1879–1857), town planner
- Michael Chan (1940–2006), Baron Chan of Oxton in the County of Merseyside
- John Hughes (1903–1977), Olympic gold medal-winning architect
- Cyril Scott (1879–1970), composer
- Edith Smith (1876–1923), first female police officer in the United Kingdom with full power of arrest
- Brigadier Philip Toosey, (1904–1975), military officer
- Charles Whittle (1921–2001), cricketer

=== Ron Gittins ===
8 Silverdale Road, Oxton, known as Ron's Place, is a former rented flat which is grade II listed because of tenant Ron Gittins' outsider art work on its interior. The director of The Twentieth Century Society, Catherine Croft, described the building as "the first example of outsider art to be nationally listed".

== See also ==
- Listed buildings in Oxton, Merseyside
