= Ron's Place =

Outsider art site in Merseyside, England

Coordinates: 53°23′2″N 3°3′5″W

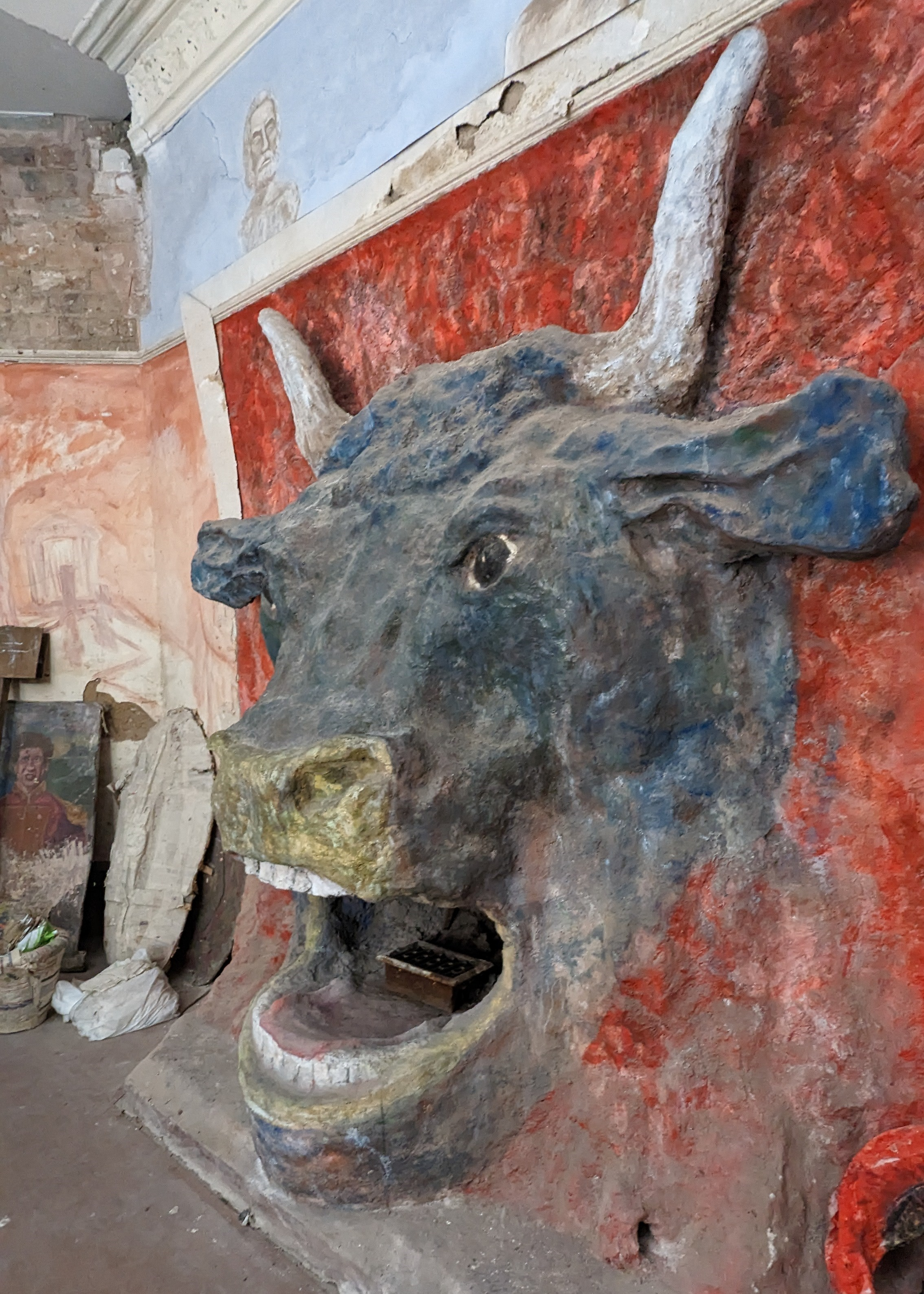
- Minotaur's head fireplace
- Interactive map of the Ron's Place area

General information
- Location: 8 Silverdale Road, Oxton, Birkenhead, Merseyside, England

Design and construction
- Designations

Listed Building – Grade II
- Official name: 8 Silverdale Road, Oxton
- Designated: 19 March 2024
- Reference no.: 1486042

Website
- ronsplace.co.uk

Ron's Place is a former rented flat at 8 Silverdale Road in Oxton, Birkenhead, Merseyside, England, which is Grade II listed in recognition of the visionary environment of outsider art created by its tenant Ron Gittins between 1986 and 2019.

== Ron Gittins ==
Ronald Geoffrey Gittins (1939–2019) was an outsider artist. He was born in Birkenhead in 1939, one of three children of James and Alice Gittins. He attended the Laird School of Art briefly and also had some theological training, but worked as a skilled cutter in the printing industry, in retail in Liverpool, and as a factory control officer for a white goods manufacturer in Bromborough. He was a talented musician, singing in church when a boy and later "a brilliant Buddy Holly impersonator", and also performed with local amateur dramatic groups. At one stage, as a self-employed artist, he established Minstrel Enterprises, a business featuring himself as "The Minstrel".

While living at his parents' rented home he transformed his own bedroom in the style of a Roman villa. When Gittins was 35, the Liverpool Echo featured his decoration of his then home at Beta Close, Bebington, in a story headlined "Pictures of Pompeii Help Put Ron to Sleep" with a photograph of the walls and ceiling of his bedroom, painted with Roman scenes and emperors.

Gittins lived alone at 8 Silverdale Road, Oxton, from 1986 until his death in September 2019. The terms of his lease allowed him to decorate the house as he liked, without the need to seek his landlord's prior consent. Over the 33 years he lived there he extensively decorated the entire flat, including external columns beside the front door which were removed by the landlord before they could be rescued. Gittins was interested in history, and was inspired by ancient Egypt, Greece, and Rome in his decorations. It has been said that:

He was a familiar sight in Oxton Village, where he would walk along the streets dressed in a series of homemade military costumes, pushing an old-fashioned pram filled with the bags of cement he used to build his gigantic fireplaces.

== Discovery and preservation ==
In January 2020, the formerly rented ground-floor flat was found to contain a collection of outsider art produced by Gittins, and never previously seen. It includes sculptures of a lion and the head of the Minotaur, underwater scenes and rooms based on ancient Egyptian and Greek themes. A crowdfunding appeal was launched to save the work. Fundraising was also supported by Pulp singer Jarvis Cocker.

Descriptions of visits to the flat in 2021 were written by Denise Courcoux in The Double Negative, Matthew Hogarth in Bido Lito! and Cathy Ward in Brut Journal. The Wirral Arts and Culture Community Land Trust (WACCLT) was established in December 2021 as the first arts-based community land trust in the United Kingdom, with the aim to "save Ron's Place and create a stimulating, positive legacy for the Wirral and the wider community."

The semi-detached house containing the flat was auctioned on 1 March 2023 and was bought by WACCLT, with the help of a donation from the Muller Wimhurst Trust, to preserve the artworks.

Writing in the journal Epidemiology and Psychiatric Sciences, Lisa Slominski says that "Oscillating between an idiosyncratic subjectivity and universal offering, the power held in Ron's Place is undeniable."

In March 2024, the ground-floor flat was given Grade II listed building status by Historic England. The director of The Twentieth Century Society, Catherine Croft, described the building as "the first example of outsider art to be nationally listed."

== Gallery ==
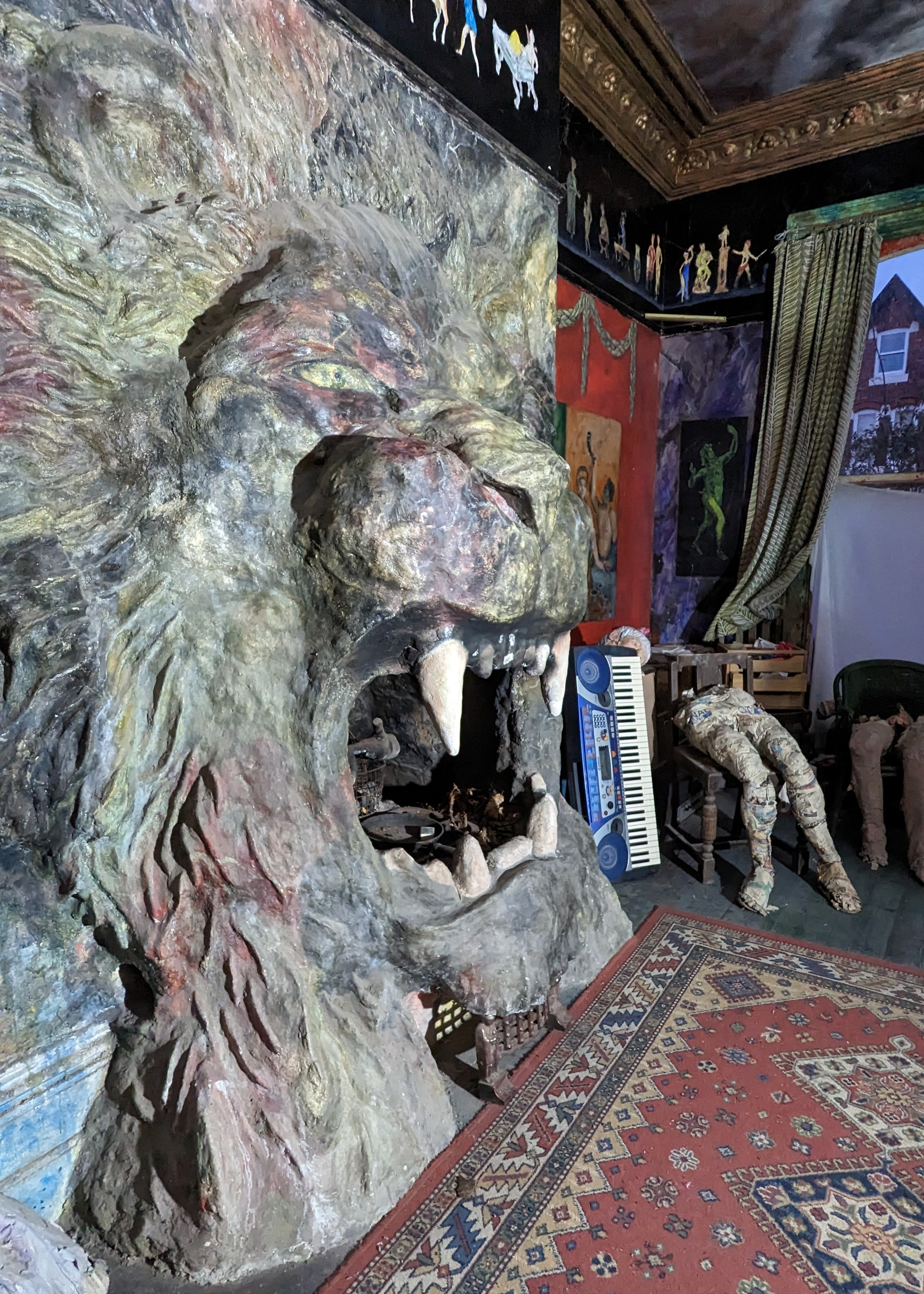
Lion's Head fireplace

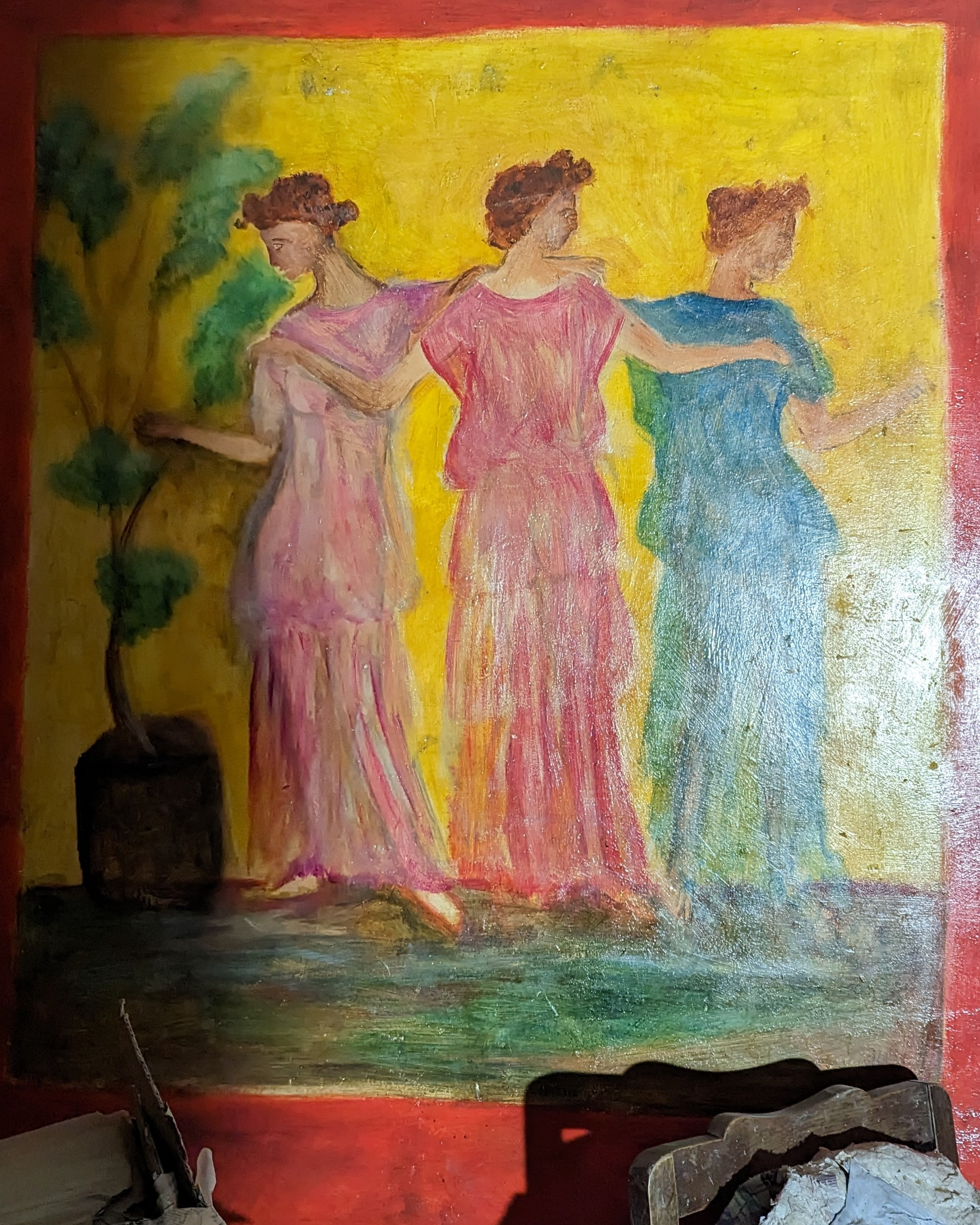
Painting of three women on a wall

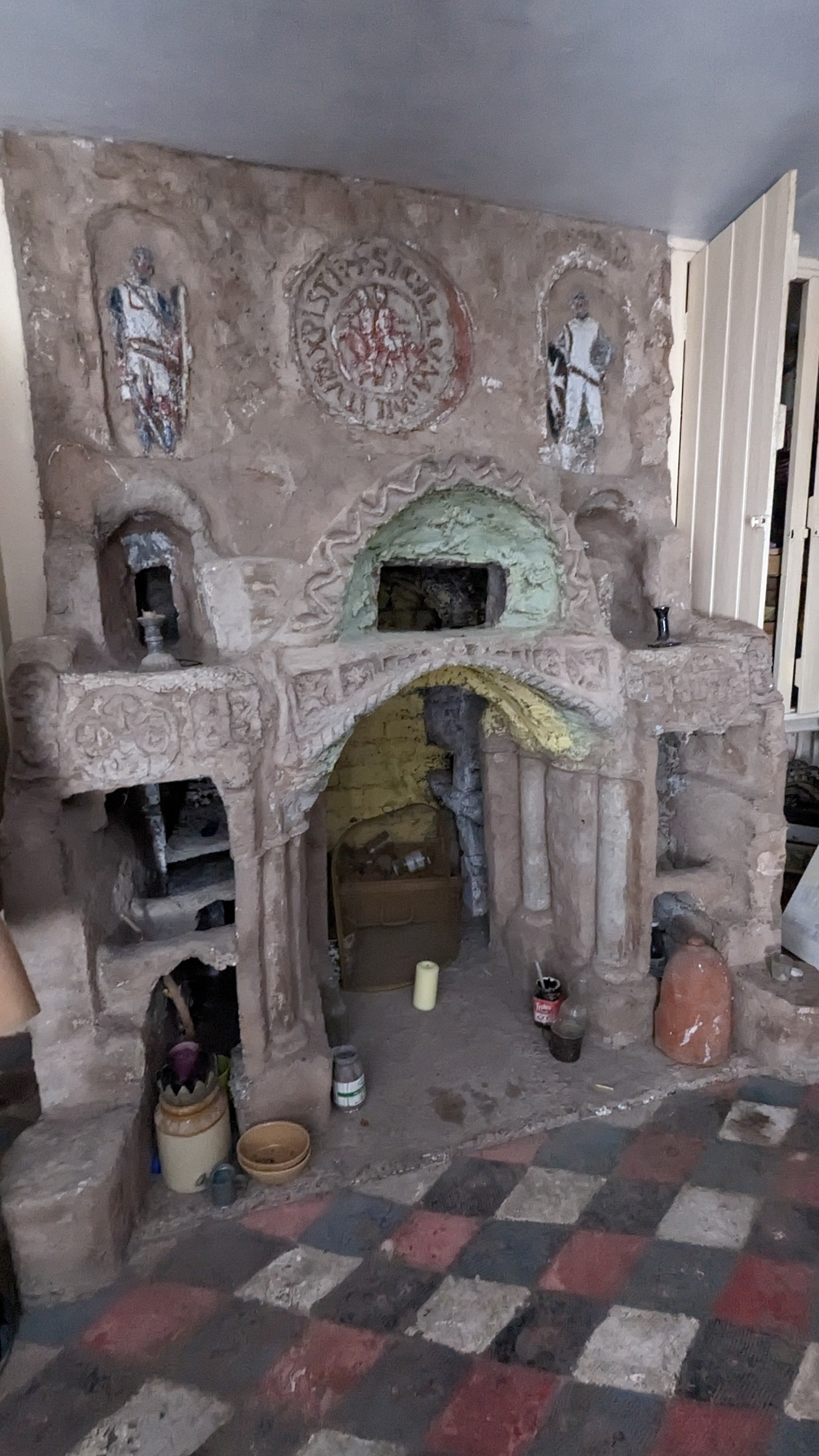
Ornate fireplace

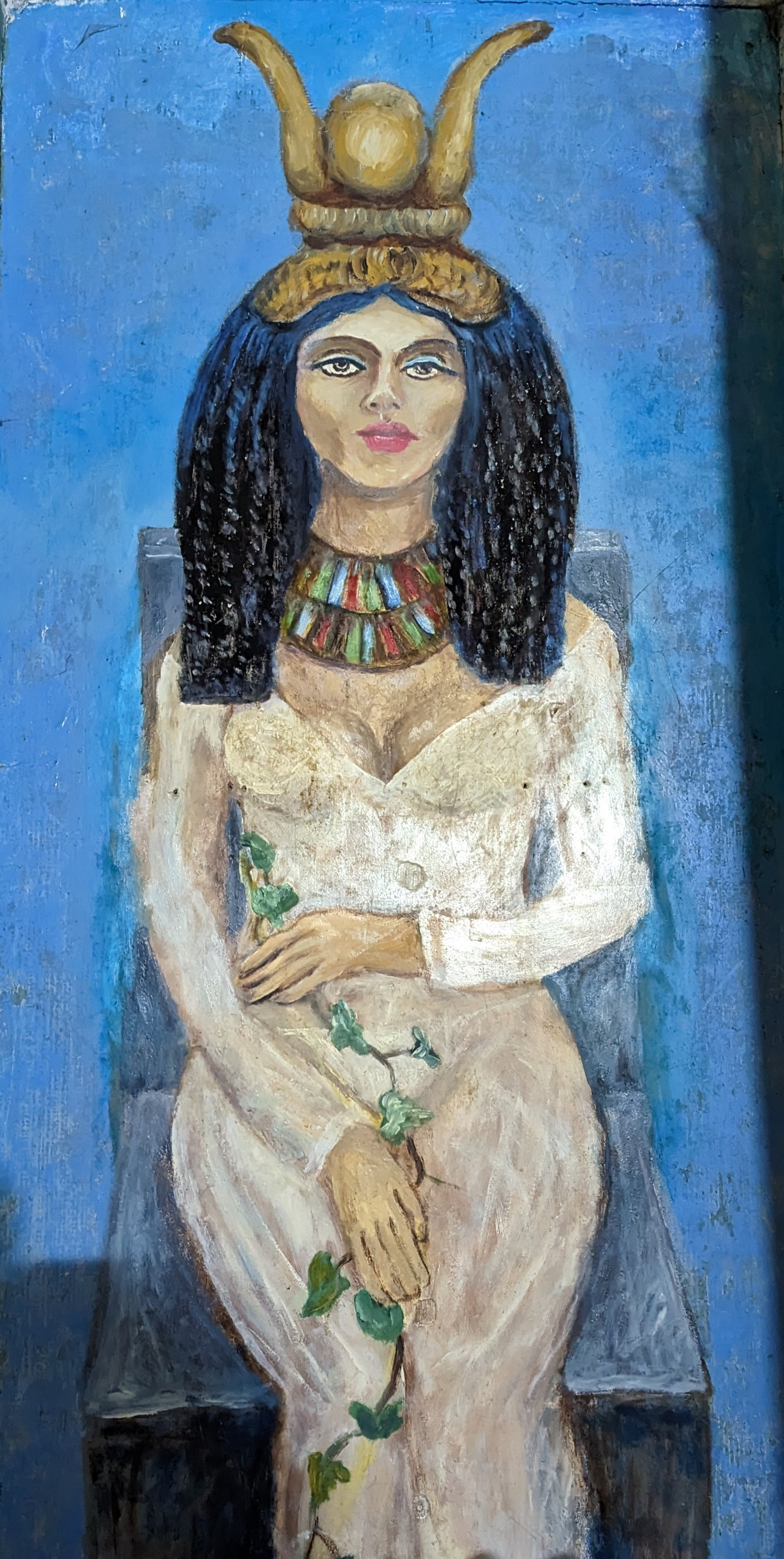
Painting of woman in Egyptian style dress

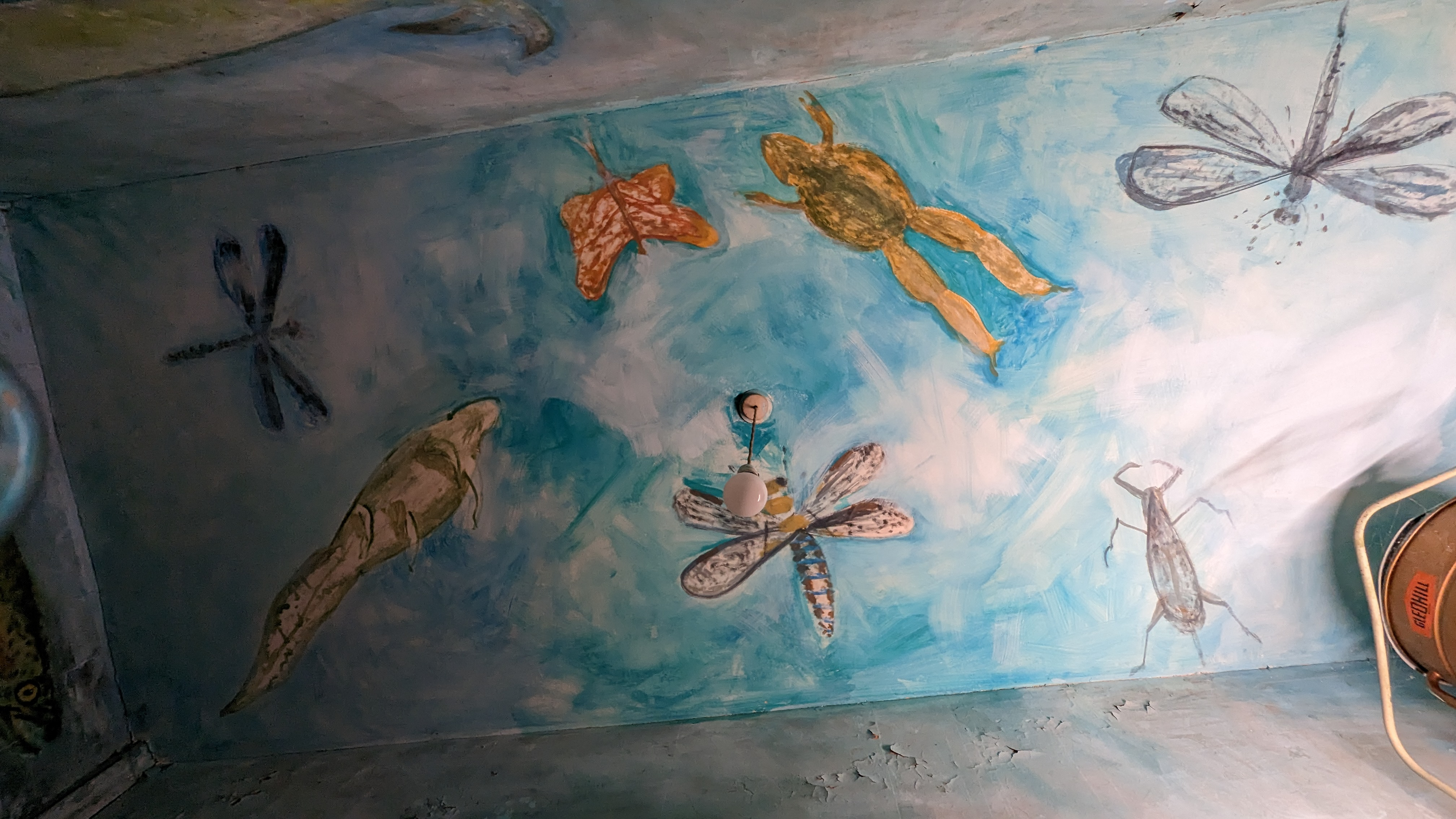
Bathroom ceiling

== See also ==
- 575 Wandsworth Road
- David Parr House
