= St Saviour's Church, Oxton =

Coordinates: 53.3823°N 3.0517°W

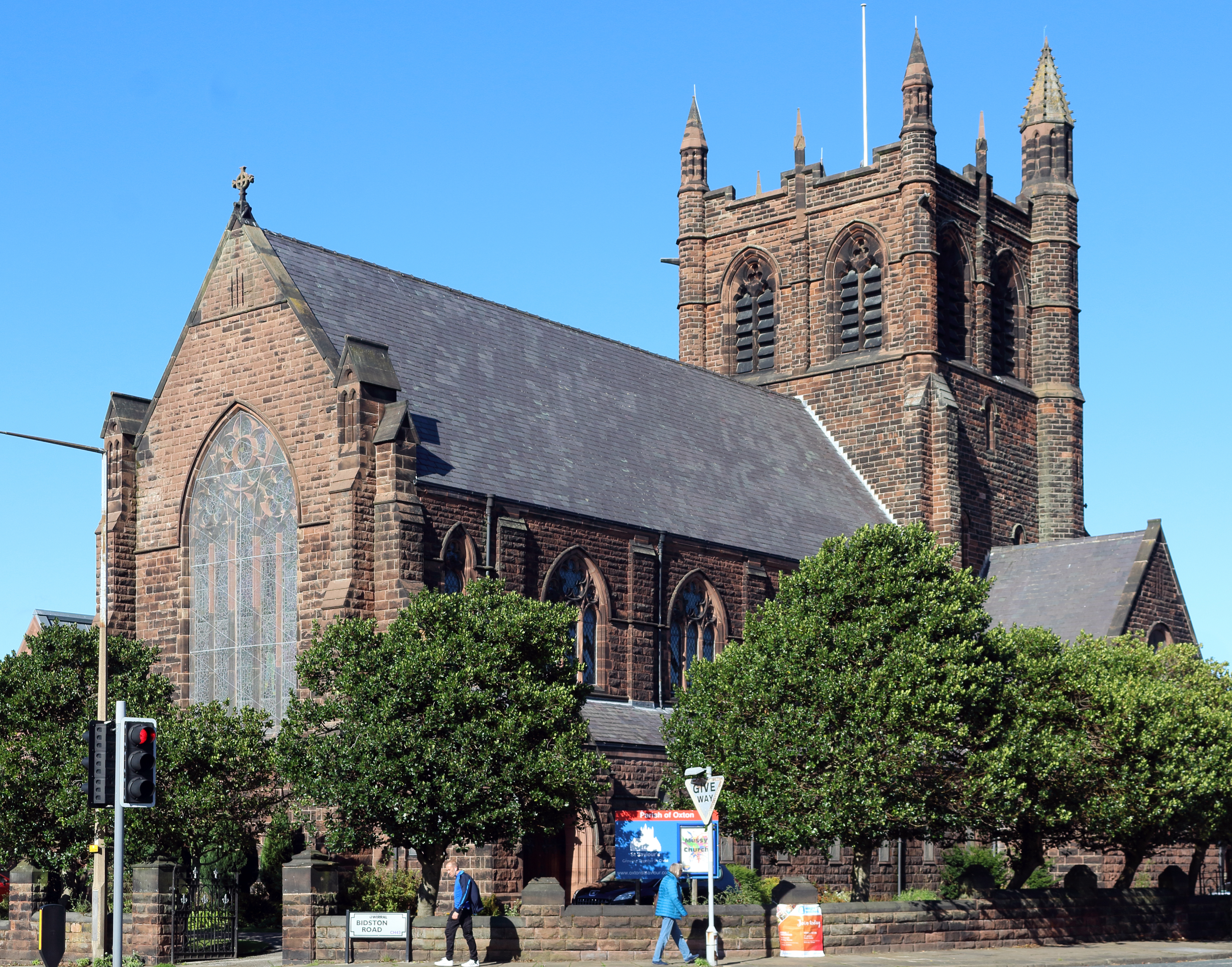
- St Saviour's Church, Oxton, from the southwest

- Location in Merseyside
- OS grid reference: SJ 302 878
- Location: Bidston Road, Oxton, Birkenhead, Merseyside CH43 2JZ
- Country: England
- Denomination: Anglican
- Churchmanship: Central
- Website: oxtonstsaviour.co.uk

History
- Status: Parish church
- Dedicated: 26 May 1892

Architecture
- Functional status: Active
- Heritage designation: Grade II*
- Designated: 28 March 1984
- Architect(s): C. W. Harvey, Pennington and Bridgen
- Architectural type: Church
- Style: Gothic Revival
- Groundbreaking: 1889
- Completed: 1892

Specifications
- Materials: Sandstone, slate roof

Administration
- Province: York
- Diocese: Chester
- Archdeaconry: Chester
- Deanery: Birkenhead
- Parish: St Saviour, Oxton

Clergy
- Vicar: The Rev Marc Wolverson

St Saviour's Church is in Bidston Road, Oxton, Birkenhead, Merseyside, England. It is an active Anglican parish church in the deanery of Birkenhead, the archdeaconry of Chester, and the diocese of Chester. Its benefice is united with that of St Andrew, Noctorum. The church is recorded in the National Heritage List for England as a designated Grade II* listed building.

== History ==
St Saviour's was built between 1889 and 1892 to replace a church of 1846 that had become too small for the needs of its congregation. The architects were C. W. Harvey with Pennington and Bridgen. The foundation stone was laid on 26 March 1889. The first service was held in the church in 1891, although the tower was not fully built at that time. The building of the tower was completed in the following year, and the church was dedicated on 26 May 1892. In 1941 the roof and east end of the church were damaged by a bomb, These were rebuilt by Leonard Barnish, the east wall being rebuilt in a simplified form.

== Architecture ==
=== Exterior ===
The church is constructed in red sandstone with a Welsh slate roof. Its architectural style is Decorated, and the church has a cruciform plan; the plan consists of a nave with a clerestory, north and south aisles under lean-to roofs, a south porch, north and south transepts, a tower at the crossing, and a chancel. At the west end is a large five-light window containing Decorated tracery. Along the sides of the aisles are eight lancet windows, and the clerestory has four three-light windows with Decorated tracery, between which are pilaster buttresses. In the transepts are two-light Decorated windows, with a rose window above them. The tower rises for two stages above the body of the church, and has angle buttresses that rise to octagons and end in pinnacles. In the south east corner of the tower is an octagonal stair turret. The bell openings are in pairs, louvred, and contain plate tracery. Between them are pilasters that terminate in pinnacles. The parapet of the tower is embattled. At the east end of the church is a circular window, which replaced the original bomb-damaged window.

=== Interior ===
Inside the church are four-bay arcades. Many of the fittings are in rich Arts and Crafts style. The reredos was designed by G. F. Bodley. It is in gilded oak and takes the form of a triptych. In the centre is a depiction of Christ in Glory above a depiction of the Nativity. These are flanked by figures of four Church Fathers. On the wings are figures of Saint Werburgh and Saint Cecilia, each of which is flanked by two angels. The chancel screen and choir and clergy stalls are by Edward Rae. They are carved and inlaid; the clergy stalls include canopies and misericords. The reredos in the south chapel is also by Rae; this contains four angels carved by Harry Hems. By the north chapel is a plaque by Della Robbia. The octagonal font is in alabaster. It contains panels carved with depictions of Christ and a lamb, and of three of the evangelists. Set into the west wall of the church is a war memorial of 1920 by Giles Gilbert Scott. It is in white marble with a black marble background and a red sandstone surround, and depicts the Crucifixion and angels. Below this are inscribed the names of the fallen.

The stained glass in the east window, dedicated in 1974, is by Leonard Evetts. Before the war damage there was a set of windows in the chancel by C. E. Kempe, but only one of these has survived. There is more glass by Kempe in the vestry that has been moved from a house nearby. The west window and a window in the north transept of 1903 were designed by Edward Burne-Jones and made by Morris & Co. The original three-manual pipe organ was made by Robert Hope-Jones. It was reconstructed in 1908 by Norman and Beard. Work was carried out on this organ in 1935, 1947 and 1962 by Rushworth and Dreaper. In 1985 Rushworth and Dreaper replaced this organ, re-using parts and pipes from the previous organ, and from a Conacher organ taken from a redundant church in Southport, to make a four-manual organ. There is a ring of ten bells, eight of which were cast in 1895 by John Taylor & Co, the ring being augmented to 10 in 1976.

== See also ==
- Grade II* listed buildings in Merseyside
- Listed buildings in Oxton, Merseyside
