= Christ Church, Birkenhead =

Coordinates: 53.3831°N 3.0401°W

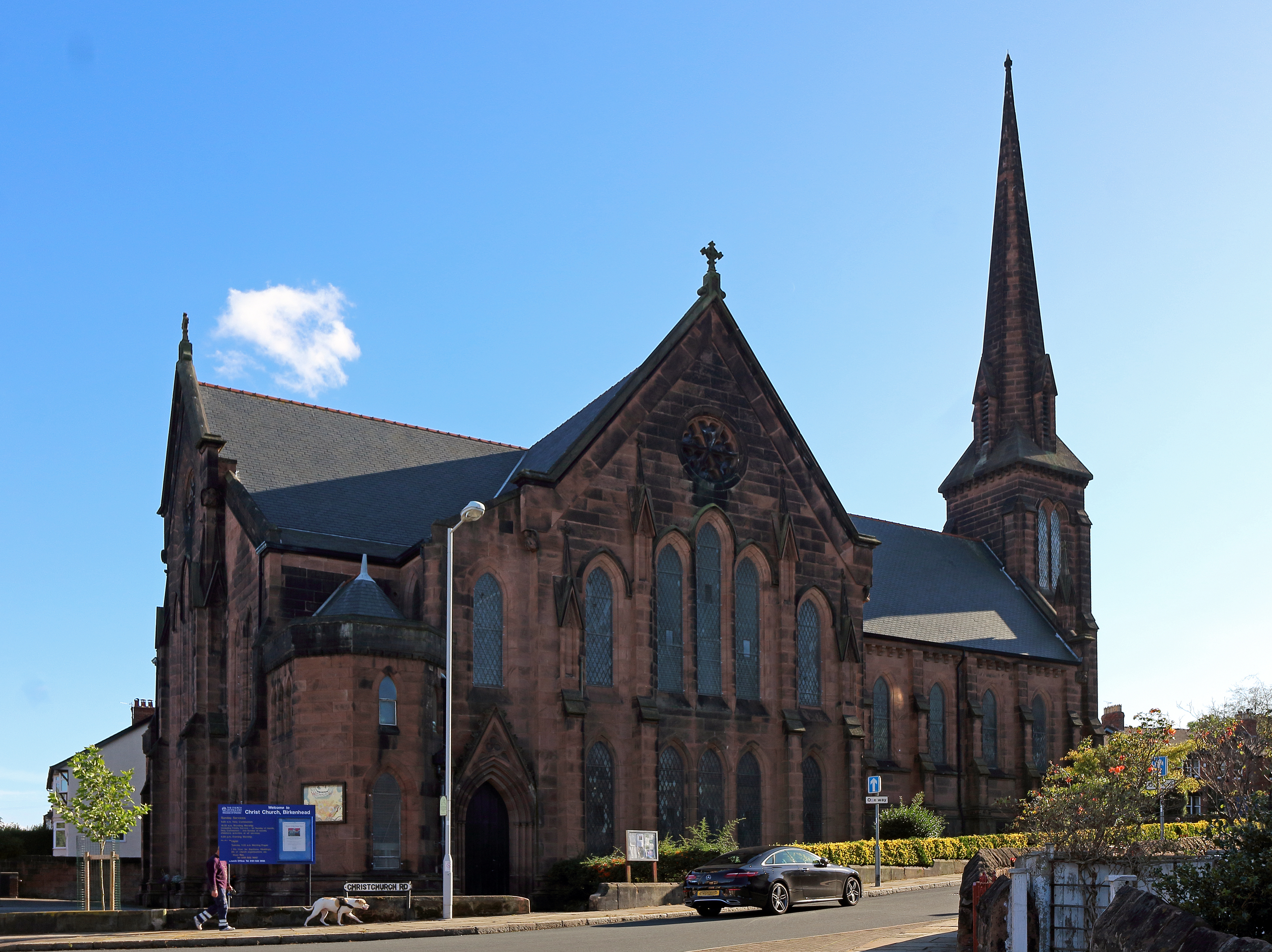
- Christ Church from the northeast

- Location in Merseyside
- OS grid reference: SJ 309 879
- Location: Christchurch Road, Oxton, Birkenhead, Wirral, Merseyside
- Country: England
- Denomination: Anglican
- Churchmanship: Conservative Evangelical
- Website: Christ Church, Birkenhead

History
- Status: Parish church
- Consecrated: 3 March 1854

Architecture
- Functional status: Active
- Heritage designation: Grade II
- Designated: 28 March 1974
- Architect: William Jearrad
- Architectural type: Church
- Style: Gothic Revival
- Groundbreaking: 1844
- Completed: 1849
- Construction cost: £9,000

Specifications
- Materials: Sandstone, slate roof

Administration
- Province: York
- Diocese: Chester
- Archdeaconry: Chester
- Deanery: Birkenhead
- Parish: Birkenhead Christ Church

Clergy
- Vicar: Revd Karen Freeman

Christ Church is in Christchurch Road, Oxton, Birkenhead, Wirral, Merseyside, England. It is an active Anglican parish church in the deanery of Birkenhead, the archdeaconry of Chester, and the diocese of Chester. The church is recorded in the National Heritage List for England as a designated Grade II listed building. It stands on a sloping site.

== History ==
Christ Church was built between 1844 and 1849, and was designed by William Jearrad. It cost £9,000 to build (equivalent to £990,000 in 2025), and was opened for worship on 25 February 1849, although it was not consecrated until 3 March 1854, this ceremony being conducted by the Rt Revd John Graham, bishop of Chester. The church provided seating for 1,209 people. Alterations were made at the east end between 1878 and 1880. Using the slope of the ground, two staircases were built to provide extra exits, and two rooms were added at the lower level. In 1881 the organ and the choir were moved from the west gallery, the organ to a new organ chamber in the south transept, and the choir to the chancel. The pulpit was lowered, and a clock was added to the spire. In 1992 the roof and ceiling were replaced, and the interior of the church was reorganised. The spire was damaged in a storm on Christmas Eve in 1997, and had to be rebuilt. A special edition of Songs of Praise was broadcast in November 2018 from the church to mark the centenary of the death of war poet Wilfred Owen who was a member of the congregation in his youth.

== Architecture ==
=== Exterior ===
The church is constructed in red sandstone from local quarries. It is roofed in Welsh slate. The plan consists of a six-bay nave, north and south transepts, a chancel with north and south aisles, and a west tower with a spire. The rooms under the east end of the church are used as an office, kitchen and toilets. The tower is in two stages, with a west door, over which is a quatrefoil and a clock face. The bell openings are paired, and on the tower is a broach spire with lucarnes. Along the sides of the nave the bays are divided by buttresses rising to pinnacles, and each bay contains a wide lancet window. The transepts have two bays and, because of the sloping ground, are in two storeys. There are five windows in each storey, and a rose window in the gable above. At the corners of the east end are gabled projections containing stairs and a doorway. At the east end, the aisles have paired lancets, and a doorway at the lower level. The chancel east window consists of three stepped lancets, with a rose window above. Below these are triple lancets lighting the lower area.

=== Interior ===
Inside the church there are galleries at the west end and in the transepts. Many of the items of church furniture has been given as memorials. These include the font, the lectern, and the pulpit. The pulpit was given in memory of two soldiers killed in the First World War, and includes in its carvings two soldiers kneeling at the foot of the cross in a Crucifixion scene. Much of the stained glass, including that in the east window and on the north side of the church, was destroyed by a landmine during the Second World War. The current stained glass in the east window dates from 1951. The stained glass in the windows on the south side of the church was given as memorials; one of them depicts a scene from The Pilgrim's Progress.

=== Organ ===
The original pipe organ was built by Henry Willis in about 1860. It had two manuals and was located in the west gallery. It was moved to the south transept in 1881. Here it was acoustically unsatisfactory, and additions, including a third manual, were made by Willis in 1888. Between that date and 1925 a vox humana stop was added by a builder other than Willis. In 1925 the organ was damaged by fire following a lightning strike. The successors of Willis repaired the damage and made further additions. The organ was not damaged by the land mine, and it was cleaned and overhauled in 1948, again by the Willis firm. A further overhaul took place in 1977 by Rushworth and Dreaper.

== See also ==
- Listed buildings in Oxton, Merseyside
