= Charles Whittle (cricketer) =

English cricketer

Personal information
- Full name: Charles James Richardson Whittle
- Born: 26 September 1921; Oxton, Cheshire, England
- Died: 4 July 2001 (aged 79); England
- Batting: Right-handed
- Bowling: Leg break

Domestic team information
- Years: Team
- 1947: Oxford University
- 1947: Oxfordshire

Career statistics
| Competition | First-class |
|---|---|
| Matches | 2 |
| Runs scored | 23 |
| Batting average | 5.75 |
| 100s/50s | –/– |
| Top score | 10 |
| Catches/stumpings | 1/– |
- Source: ESPNcricinfo, 25 June 2019

Charles James Richardson Whittle (26 September 1921 – 4 July 2001) was an English first-class cricketer.

While studying at Christ Church, Oxford, Whittle made two appearances in first-class cricket for Oxford University against Gloucestershire and Yorkshire, both at Oxford in 1947. In that same season he played minor counties cricket for Oxfordshire, making a single appearance against Devon in the Minor Counties Championship. He died 64 years later in July 2001.
