= Nest (magazine) =

Nest: A Quarterly of Interiors
- Frequency: Quarterly
- Founder: Joseph Holtzman
- First issue: Fall 1997; 29 years ago
- Final issue: Fall 2004
- Country: United States
- Based in: New York City
- Language: English
- Website: www.nestmagazine.com
- ISSN: 1098-4585

Nest: A Quarterly of Interiors was a magazine published from 1997 to 2004, for a total run of 26 issues. The first issue was Fall 1997, and the second issue was Fall 1998. Thereafter, the issues were Winter '98-'99, Spring '99, Summer '99, Fall '99, Winter '99-'00, and so on until Fall '04. The founder was Joseph Holtzman. It was published in Upper East Side, New York City.

Marketed as an interior design magazine, and edited by Joseph Holtzman, Nest generally eschewed the conventionally beautiful luxury interiors showcased in other magazines, and instead featured photographs of nontraditional, exceptional, and unusual environments. Fred A. Bernstein, writing in the New York Times, wrote that Joseph Holtzman "believed that an igloo, a prison cell or a child's attic room (adorned with Farrah Fawcett posters) could be as compelling as a room by a famous designer." During its run, Nest showed the room of a 40-year-old diaper lover, the lair of an Indonesian bird that decorates with colored stones and vomit, the final resting place of Napoleon's penis, the quarters of Navy seamen, a barbed-wire-trimmed bed that doubled as a tank, and a Gothic Christmas card from filmmaker John Waters. Noted architect Rem Koolhaas called it "an anti-materialistic, idealistic magazine about the hyperspecific in a world that is undergoing radical leveling, an 'interior design' magazine hostile to the cosmetic." Artist Richard Tuttle was quoted as saying that Mr. Holtzman "channeled the collective unconscious, to give us the pleasure of ornament before we even knew we wanted it."

== Awards ==
- 2000, General Excellence Award, The American Society of Magazine Editors
- 2001, Best Design, The American Society of Magazine Editors
