= Statue of John Laird =

Memorial in Birkenhead, England

Coordinates: 53.39379°N 3.01673°W

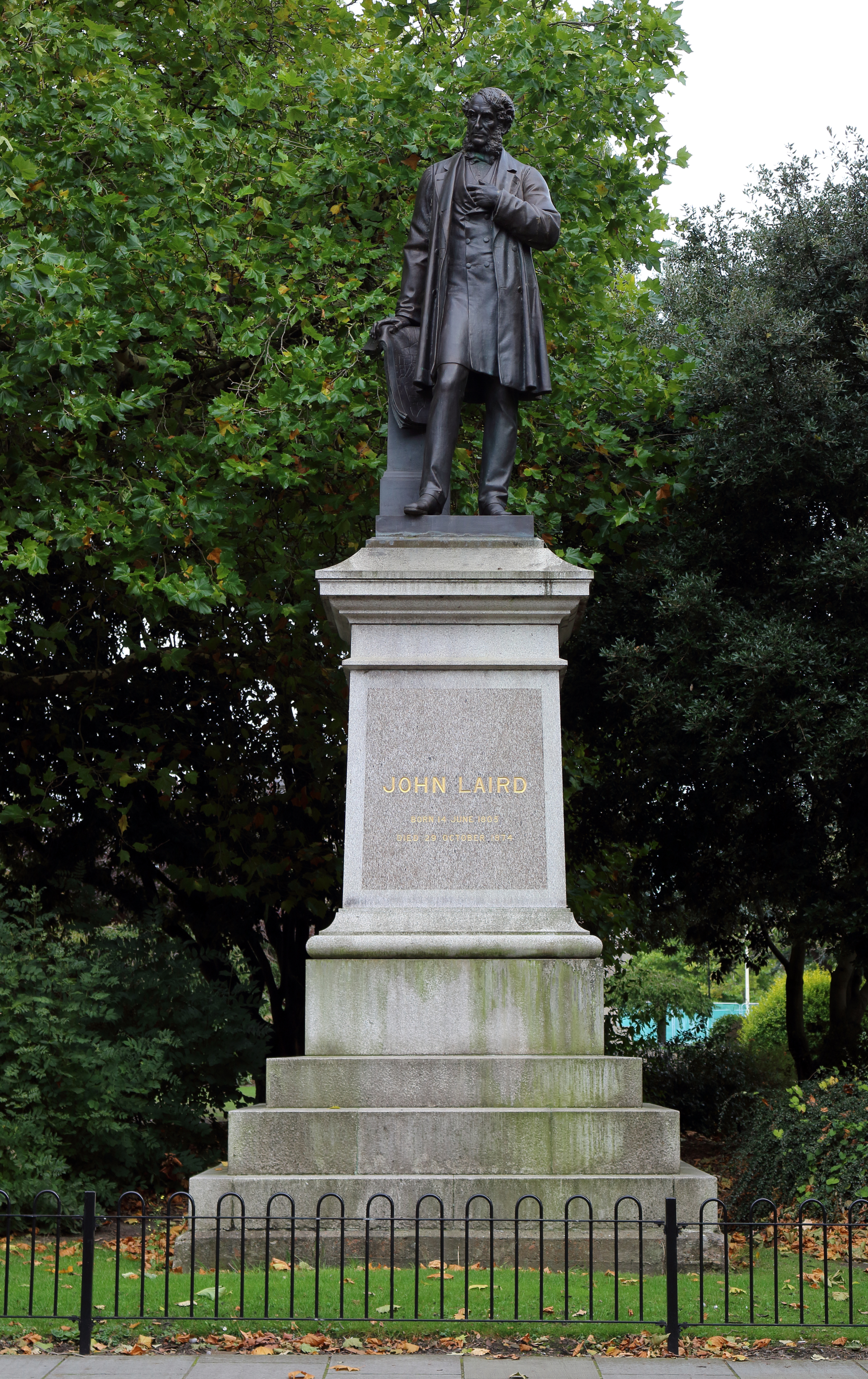
Statue of John Laird

The Statue of John Laird stands on the west side of Hamilton Square, Birkenhead, Merseyside, England. It commemorates the life of John Laird, a local ship builder, politician and benefactor. The statue was sculpted by Albert Bruce-Joy, and unveiled in 1877 by Lord Tollemache. It is recorded in the National Heritage List for England as a designated Grade II listed building.

== History ==
John Laird (1805–74) was a shipbuilder and politician. He was born in Greenock, Scotland, and as a child moved with his family to Liverpool, then in 1824 to Birkenhead, where his father, William, founded a shipbuilding business. John was educated at Liverpool Royal Institution and, after training as a solicitor, joined his father's business in 1828. When William Laird retired in 1839, John became sole partner. He retired in 1861, and the business was continued by his three sons, eventually becoming the major ship building firm of Cammell Laird. During the time that John Laird was working in the company it pioneered the use of iron-cladding of ships, and of steam propulsion for ships. When Laird retired from the business he became the first Member of Parliament for Birkenhead. He was also Chairman of the Birkenhead Improvement Commission, and a member of the Mersey Docks and Harbour Board, where he played a major part in the completion of Birkenhead Docks. In addition Laird was a benefactor, helping to provide hospitals, churches and colleges in the town.

Following his death in 1874 a public meeting was organised, and it was agreed that a statue should be erected, paid for by public subscription. More than the £2,500 needed for the statue was raised, the remainder being used for social purposes in the town. A competition for the design of the statue was arranged, and the first prize of £150 was won by Albert Bruce-Joy, a young Irish sculptor. The statue was made at the foundry of Robert Masefield and Company in Chelsea. It was unveiled on 31 October 1877 by Lord Tollemache, the occasion being witnessed by between 12,000 and 15,000 people. Originally it stood on the east side of Hamilton Square facing Birkenhead Town Hall, but was moved to the west side of the square in 1925 when the Birkenhead War Memorial was erected.

== Description ==
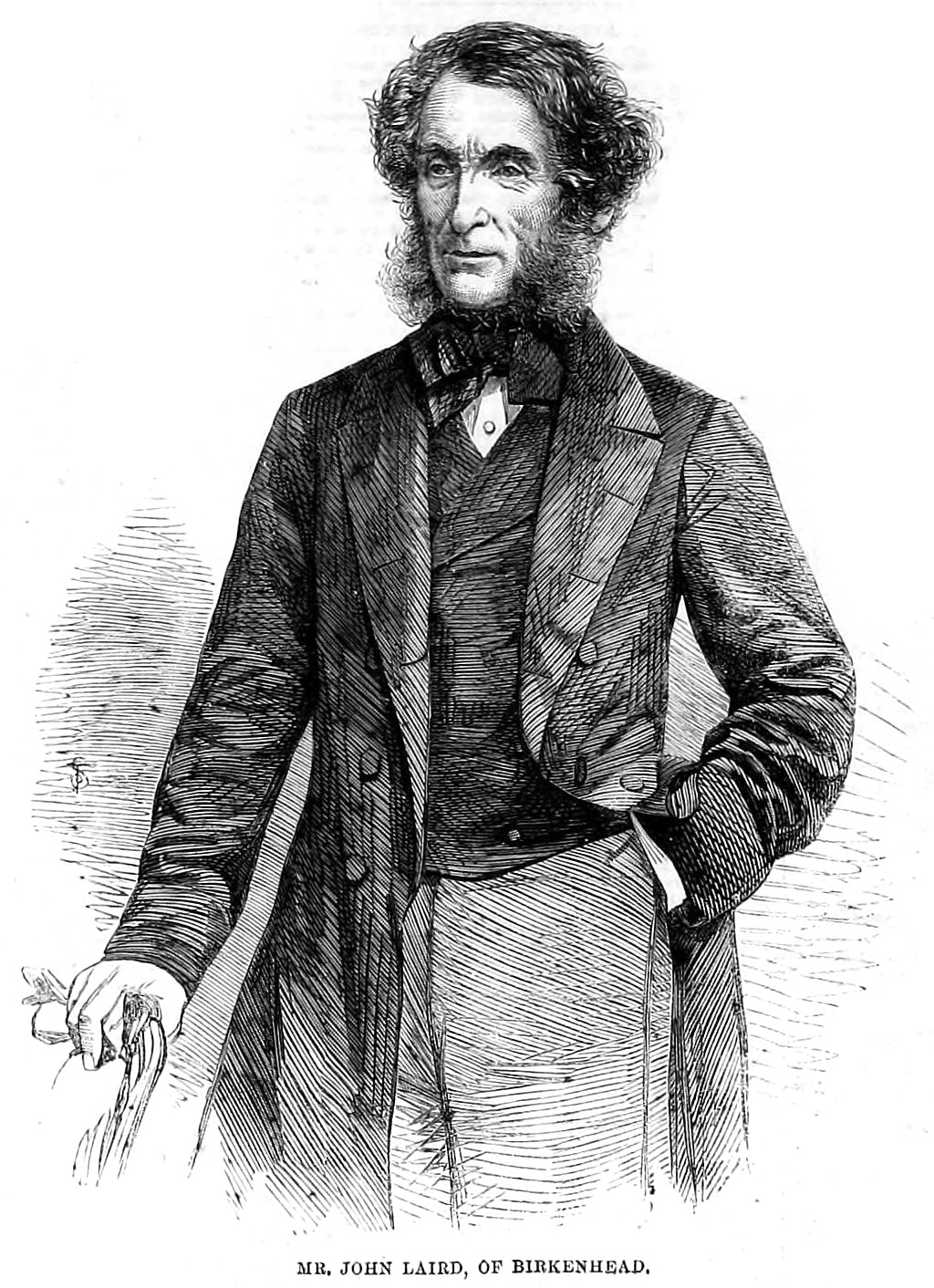
John Laird in 1861

The figure of John Laird is in bronze, and this stands on a pedestal in granite and stone. The figure is about 3.2 metres (10 ft) high and the pedestal is about 4.4 metres (14 ft) in height. Laird is depicted standing, as if speaking to a meeting, dressed in contemporary dress, including a buttoned coat and a loose overcoat. In his right hand he is holding plans for Birkenhead Docks. On the base of the statue are inscribed the details of the sculptor and the founders. The inscription the pedestal reads as follows.

JOHN LAIRD
BORN 14 JUNE 1805
DIED 29 OCTOBER 1874

== Appraisal ==
The statue was designated as a Grade II listed building on 28 March 1974. Grade II is the lowest of the three grades of listing and is applied to "buildings of national importance and special interest". In March 1877, when the figure of Laird was reaching completion, the Belfast News-Letter praised the fact that he was "represented in the ordinary dress of an English gentlemen", rather than "the senseless costume of the toga", which was fashionable in statues at the time.

== See also ==
- Listed buildings in Birkenhead
