= Birkenhead War Memorial =

WW1 & WW2 memorial in Hamilton Square, Wirral, England

Coordinates: 53.39342°N 3.01526°W

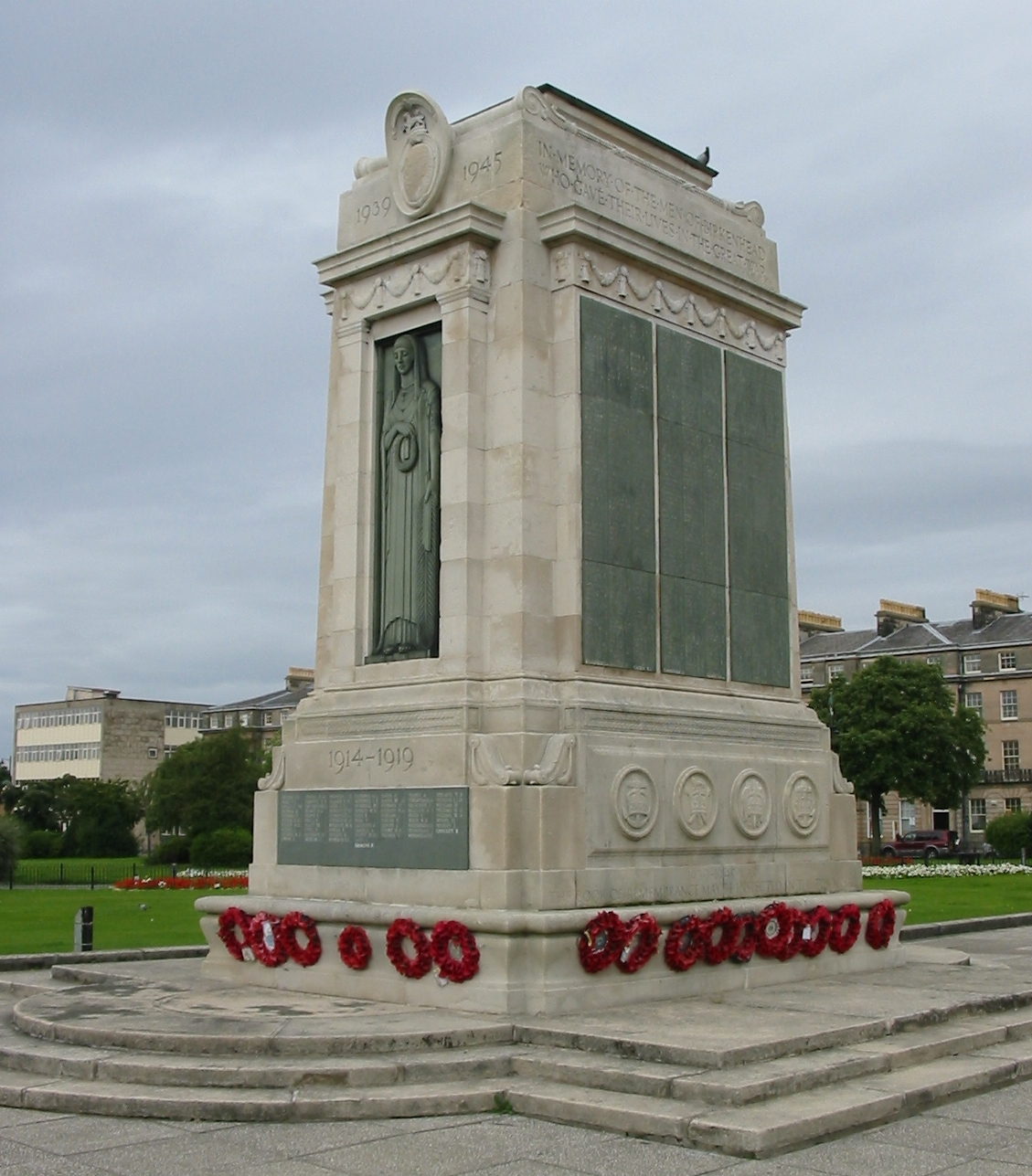
Birkenhead War Memorial

Birkenhead War Memorial, or Birkenhead Cenotaph, stands in Hamilton Square, Birkenhead, Merseyside, England, opposite the Town Hall. It consists of a cenotaph in Portland stone with carved figures and panels in Westmorland stone. The memorial was designed by Lionel Budden, and the sculptor was H. Tyson Smith. It was unveiled in 1925 by Lieutenant-General Sir Richard H. K. Butler. The memorial is recorded in the National Heritage List for England as a designated Grade II* listed building.

== History ==
In 1922 Birkenhead's War Memorial Executive Committee organised a competition to design a war memorial for the town. There were 21 designs submitted and they were exhibited in the Birkenhead Art Gallery and Museum in February 1923. Of these, 20 were in the Classical style used by Edwin Lutyens for The Cenotaph in Whitehall, London. The designs were reviewed by Charles Reilly, the Professor at the Liverpool School of Architecture. Among the designs of which he approved was that of Lionel Budden, one of his former students, who was then a senior lecturer at the School of Architecture. The assessor for the competition was Major Gilbert Fraser, President of the Liverpool Architectural Society. He selected Budden's design, and this was approved by the committee. Budden appointed H. Tyson Smith as sculptor for the figures on the memorial, which was made by Joseph Davies of Birkenhead and H. A. Clegg and Sons of Chester. (Note: Budden and Tyson Smith were to work together later in the creation of the Liverpool Cenotaph, which was completed in 1930.)

Initially it had been planned for the memorial to stand on the north side of Hamilton Square, which was vacant. However there was strong opinion that it should be on the east side of the square, opposite the Town Hall. This site was occupied by the Statue of John Laird, but it was agreed that the Laird statue should be moved to the west side of the square, and be replaced by the war memorial. The memorial was unveiled on 5 July 1925 by Sir Richard H. K. Butler. Following the Second World War, the names of those who fell in that conflict were added to the memorial. In 1987, the monument was removed for 2 months for repair work. In 2013 the monument was cleaned and restored.

== Description ==
The memorial is in Portland stone with the figures and the names of those lost in Westmorland stone. The memorial stands about 7.6 metres (25 ft) high. It has a rectangular plan, the longer sides facing east and west. The monument is set on three steps on a paved plateau, and is flanked by flagstaffs. On the longer sides are panels containing the names of those who fell in the First World War, and on the shorter sides, in smaller panels, are those who died in the Second World War. On the shorter sides, above the panels, are carvings of female figures, one holding a wreath, the other a medallion. Above the figures and panels on all sides is a frieze of festoons of laurel. Below the panels on the long sides are circular plaques carved with crests of the forces involved in the wars. Above the figures on the short sides are the arms of Birkenhead. The top of the memorial is in the form of a sarcophagus. The total estimated cost of the memorial was £3,932.

On the east side, facing the Town Hall is an inscription reading as follows.

IN MEMORY OF THE MEN OF BIRKENHEAD
WHO GAVE THEIR LIVES IN THE GREAT WAR

On the opposite long side is the following inscription.

ALL THESE WERE HONOURED IN THEIR GENERATIONS
AND WERE THE GLORY OF THEIR TIMES (Note: This is taken from Ecclesiastes, chapter 44, verse 7.)

In the medallion held by one of the figures is written:

HE DIED FOR FREEDOM AND HONOUR

Above the front seat ledge is inscribed:

1939–45
THE BOOK OF REMEMBRANCE MAY BE INSPECTED IN THE TOWN HALL

The dates "1914–1919" are inscribed below the figures on the short sides, and above them is inscribed "1939 1945 WAR". The names of the sculptor and architect are also on the memorial.

== Appraisal ==
The memorial is recorded in the National Heritage List for England as a designated Grade II* listed building, having been designated on 28 March 1974. Grade II is the middle of the three grades of listing and is applied to "particularly important buildings of more than special interest."

== See also ==
- Grade II* listed war memorials in England

== Notes and references ==
Notes

Citations

Sources

- Morris, Edward; Roberts, Emma (2012), Public Sculpture of Cheshire and Merseyside (excluding Liverpool), Public Sculpture of Britain, vol. 15, Liverpool: Liverpool University Press, ISBN 978-1-84631-492-6
- Historic England, "War Memorial (1218058)", National Heritage List for England
- Historic England, Listed Buildings
- National Recording Project, Birkenhead War Memorial (The Cenotaph), archived from the original on 15 January 2014
- Wirral Globe (2013), Renovation of Birkenhead war memorial completed (published 22 October 2013)
