= John Laird (shipbuilder) =

British shipbuilder (1805–1874)

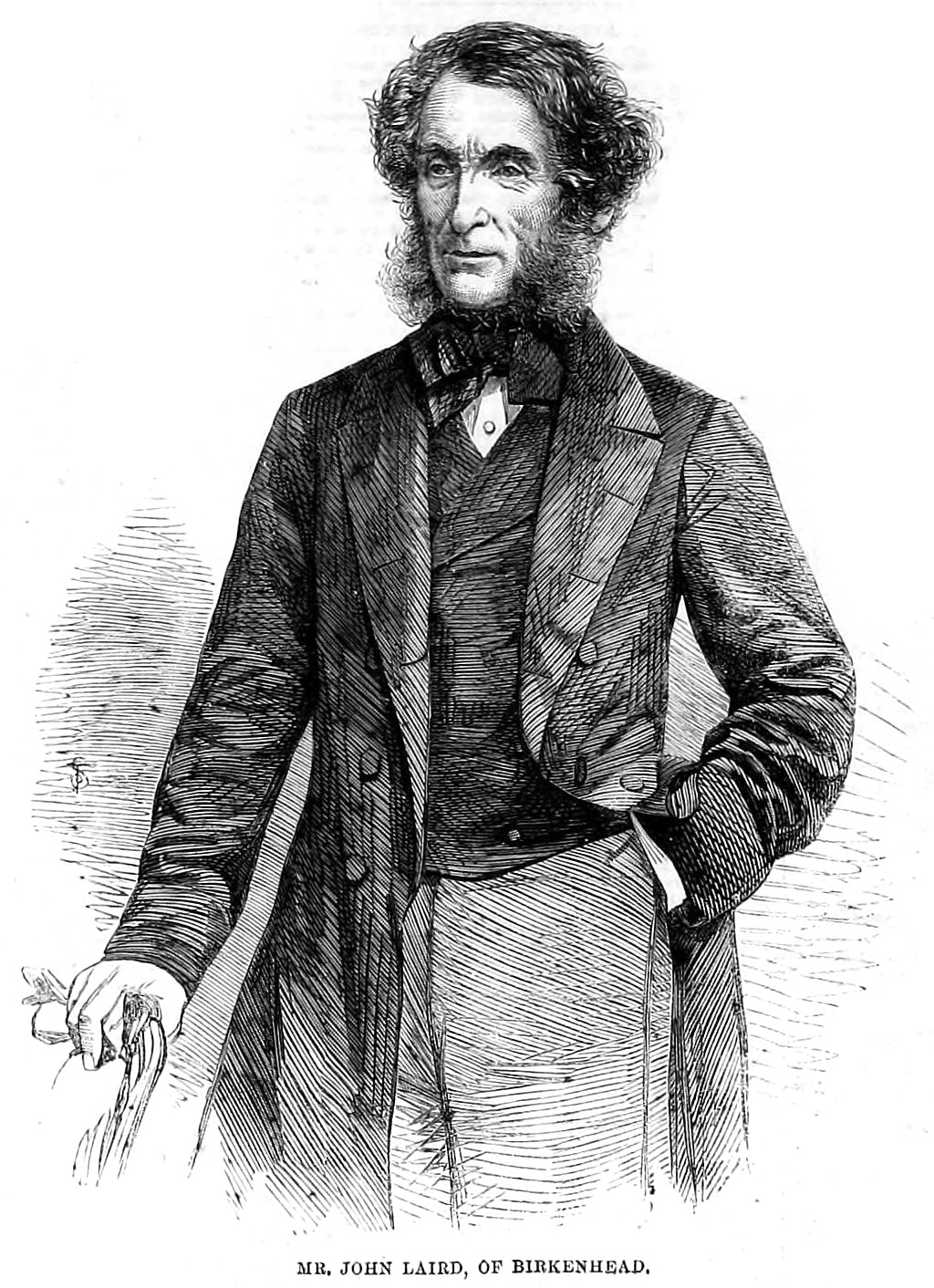

Member of Parliament for Birkenhead
- In office 1861–1874
- Succeeded by: David MacIver

Personal details
- Born: 14 June 1805 Greenock, Scotland
- Died: 29 October 1874 (aged 69) Birkenhead, England
- Parent: William Laird (father)

John Laird JP DL (14 June 1805 – 29 October 1874) was a British shipbuilder and key figure in the development of the town of Birkenhead. He was the elder brother of Macgregor Laird. He was one of the first to use iron in the construction of ships.

== Early years ==
Born in Greenock, Scotland, the eldest son of Scottish entrepreneur William Laird and Agnes (née Macgregor), John Laird was raised in Liverpool and educated at that city's Royal Institution.

In 1824 the Laird family moved to Birkenhead, on the opposite bank of the River Mersey, where William Laird and Daniel Horton established the Birkenhead Iron Works. This manufactured boilers near Wallasey Pool. This partnership was dissolved in 1828 and William Laird was joined in his business by John Laird, who had been a solicitor's articled clerk. The company was renamed William Laird & Son.

== Shipbuilding ==
Laird realised that the techniques of bending iron plates and riveting them together to build ships were similar to the principles involved in making boilers. Laird's first vessel Wye was a 60 ft pre-fabricated iron lighter in 1829 – displacement sixty tons – which was used on canals and lakes in Ireland. This was followed by further orders for more lighters and in 1833 the paddle steamer Lady Lansdowne was built for the same firm, the City of Dublin Steam Packet Company.

Many of the orders were for pre-fabricated river steamers. In 1834, he built the paddle steamer John Randolph for Savannah, Georgia, often stated, wrongly, to be the first iron ship seen in America.

In 1839 Lairds built their first screw-propelled steamer, Robert F. Stockton, a 63 ft tug for use on North American waterways. They built the first iron ships to carry guns. These were seven ships commissioned by the East India Company including the Nemesis and the Phlegethon. This, and the success of the 800 ton Mexican warship ARM Guadalupe, convinced the British admiralty in 1845 to order the first iron frigate for the Royal Navy, the 1,400 ton HMS Birkenhead, that Laird designed, famously wrecked off South Africa with the loss of over 400 soldiers in 1852. Perhaps their most famous vessel was the Confederate raider CSS Alabama. In 1857 the business moved to a new yard upstream from the Woodside Ferry, where it remained. In 1858, Lairds built Ma Robert for Dr David Livingstone's Zambezi expedition.

In 1844 John Laird started the construction of the Birkenhead Docks in the tidal Wallasey Pool. These were intended to compete with the Port of Liverpool but the venture was not a success and the system was merged with Liverpool docks in 1858.

In 1860, John Laird was joined in the business by his three sons, renaming the company John Laird, Sons & Co. The sons continued the business after their father's death in 1874 as Laird Brothers.

In 1863, Laird and his shipbuilding company were caught making two naval ram vessels for the Confederate States Navy with the cover names El Toussoun and El Monastir, known as the 'Laird Rams'. The government sent Captain Edward Augustus Inglefield of the HMS Majestic to seize the ships from the Laird's docks. Laird then sued the British government for impeding on his construction because their construction did not violate the Foreign Enlistment Act 1819 nor British neutrality. In fact, the Lincoln Administration had requested Laird to build armed iron clads for the Union in 1861.

== Personal life ==
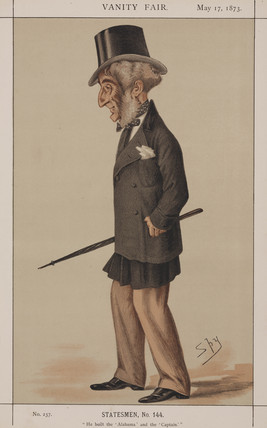
"He built the 'Alabama' and the 'Captain'" Laird as MP, caricatured by Spy (Leslie Ward) in Vanity Fair, May 1873

In 1829 Laird married Elizabeth Hurry. In 1860, John Laird was joined in partnership by his three sons, William, John and Henry. However, John Laird retired in 1861 and the business was taken over by his sons. It merged with Charles Cammell & Co. to form Cammell Laird in 1903.

He was the first mayor of Birkenhead and as chairman of the Birkenhead Improvement Commission, he played a key role in the development of the town. He was one of the first commissioners in 1833, which were appointed to erect a market, to light and clean the streets and to maintain a police force. When Birkenhead became a parliamentary borough in 1861, John Laird retired from shipbuilding to become the first Member of Parliament for Birkenhead. He served from 1861 to 1874 as a Conservative. He was also Deputy Lieutenant of Cheshire and Justice of the Peace.

He contributed a great deal to the continuous improvement of the town as a benefactor. Laird was responsible for the building of the Dock Cottages. He made some generous donations for the erection of Saint James Church, the Borough Hospital and the Laird School of Art.

== Death and legacy ==
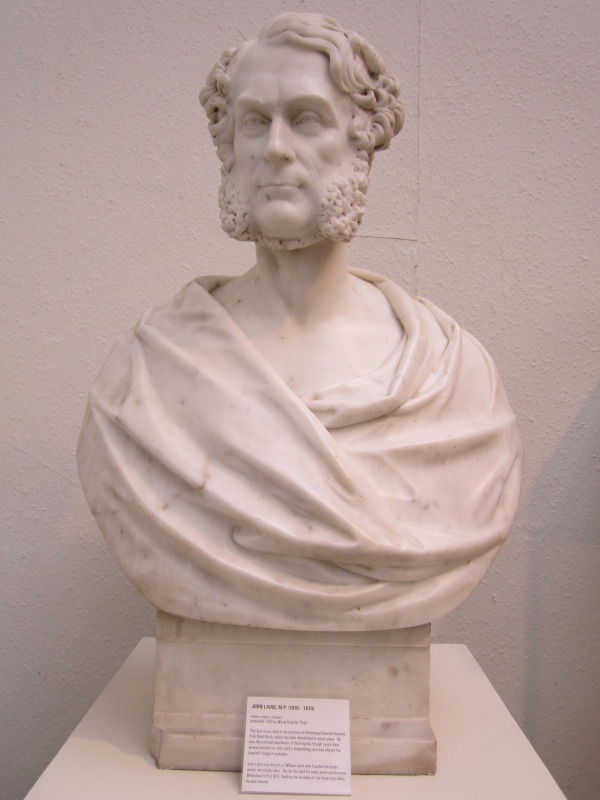
Bust of John Laird, at the Williamson Art Gallery and Museum, Birkenhead

In October 1874, Laird died at his home, 63 Hamilton Square, Birkenhead, following a riding accident in February that year. He is buried in the grounds of Birkenhead Priory, next to his yard.

An appeal for donations for a statue of John Laird quickly raised more than required from nearly 2,400 donors. The statue was sculpted by Albert Bruce-Joy. Between 12,000 and 15,000 people attended the statue's unveiling on the east side of Hamilton Square in 1877. It was unveiled by his friend, Lord Tollemache. The statue now stands in the western side of the square, having been moved from its original position after World War I to make way for a cenotaph.

Parliament of the United Kingdom
| New constituency | Member of Parliament for Birkenhead; 1861 – 1874 | Succeeded by David MacIver |
