= Lanrick Castle =

Architectural structure in Stirling, Scotland

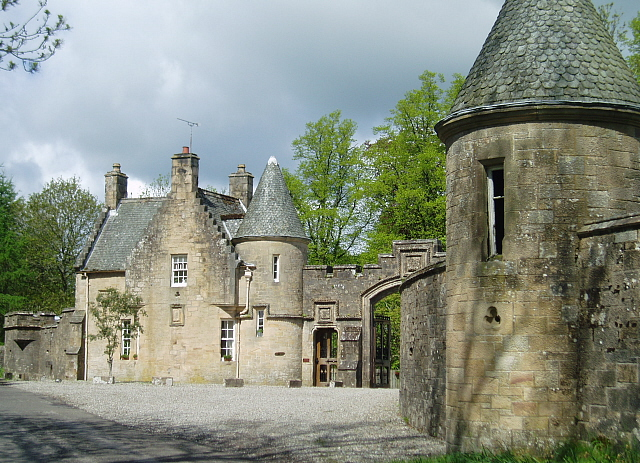
- The entrance to Lanrick Castle, one-time seat of the Clan McGregor.

- Location within Stirling

General information
- Coordinates: 56.20262°N 4.1168°W
- Demolished: 16 February 2002

Lanrick Castle was a late 18th-century country house near Doune in central Scotland. It was demolished in 2002 despite being protected as a category B listed building. It was located on the south bank of the River Teith, in Stirling council area.

== History ==
Once spelt Lanarkyngs, this name is taken as coming by metathesis from the old Brittonic word llanerch which meant "a clearing in a forest".

Lanrick was the property of the Haldane family. In the 19th century it belonged to the MacGregors, and was owned in the later 19th century by Robert Jardine of Castlemilk, MP. The house was probably built around 1790, and Gothic additions in the style of James Gillespie Graham were made in around 1815. Further alterations were made in the later 19th century, and parts of the building underwent internal remodelling in 1900.

Alistair Dickson inherited Lanrick in 1984. In April 1994 the castle was gutted by fire and lost its roof. On 16 February 2002 the remaining structure was demolished. Dickson was prosecuted for demolishing a listed structure without the necessary consent, and was fined £1,000 in January 2003. The sheriff also criticised Stirling Council for failing to take action to secure the building.

== Other structures ==
Remaining buildings on the estate include the MacGregor Monument, erected by Sir Evan John Murray MacGregor in the earlier 19th century. This takes the form of a stone tree trunk, topped by a rotunda of Roman Doric columns. The monument is a category A listed building, and is included on the Buildings at Risk Register for Scotland. Lodges, a stable block, and a riverside grotto also survive on the estate.

== Gallery ==
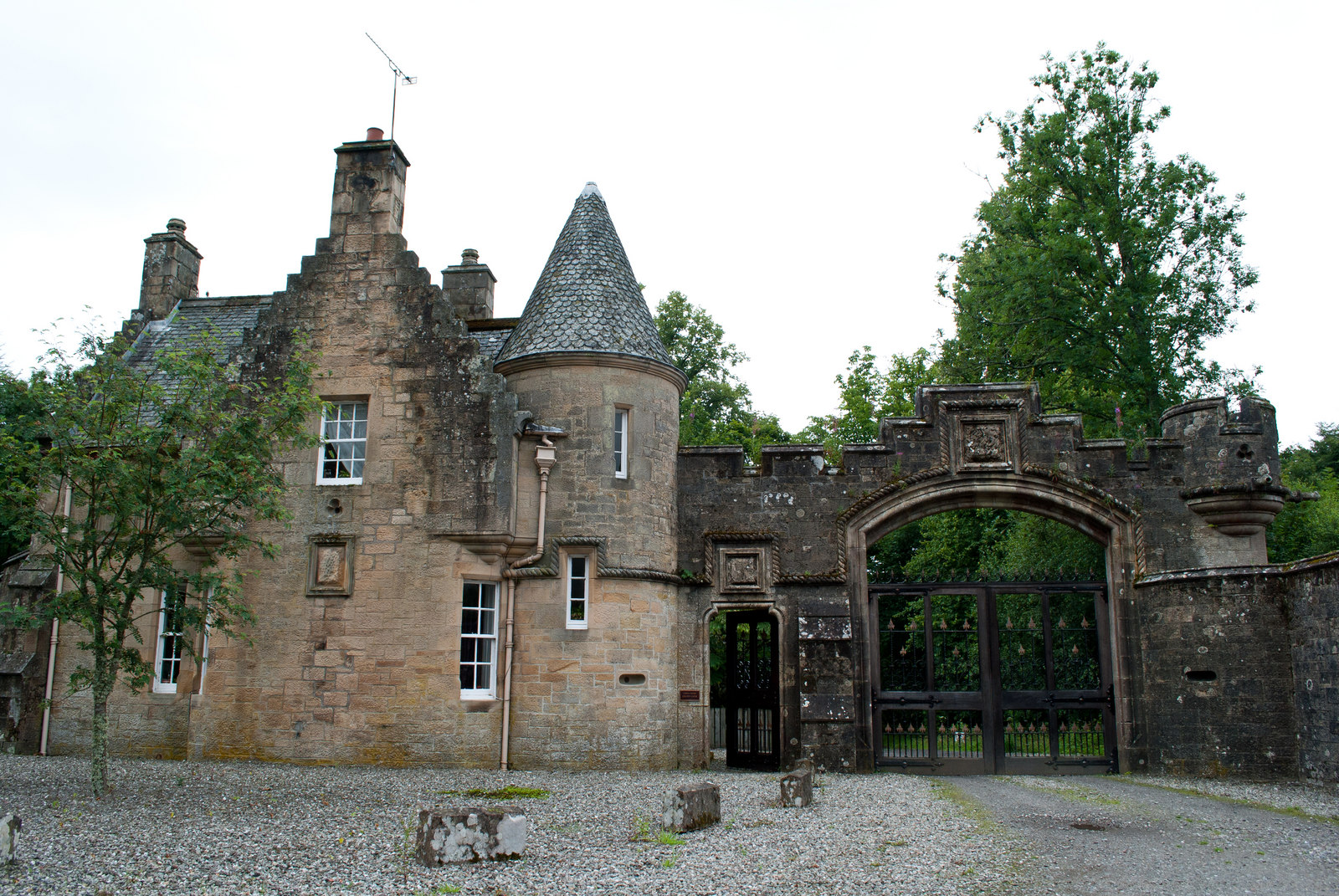
Entrance to Lanrick Castle

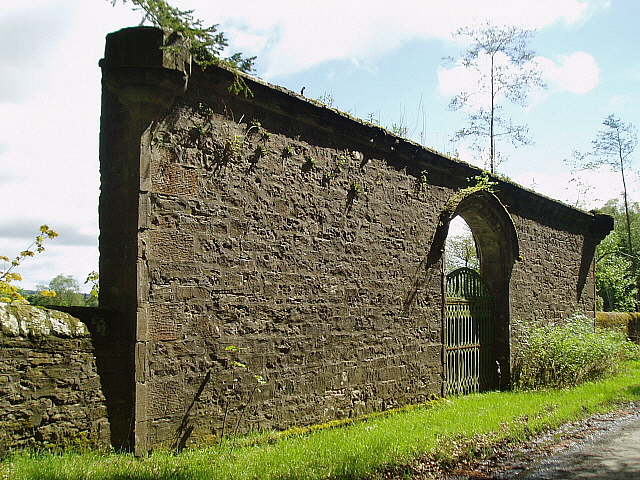
Unused gateway of Lanrick Castle

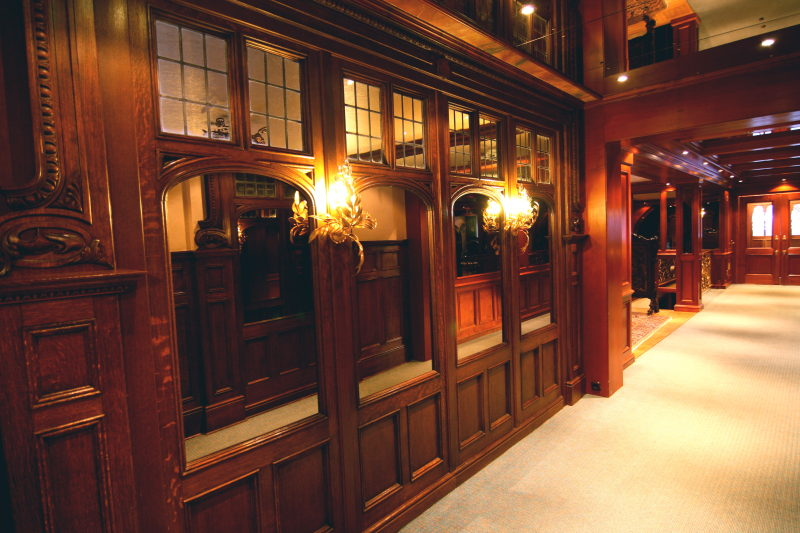
Interior, Aisle lanrick

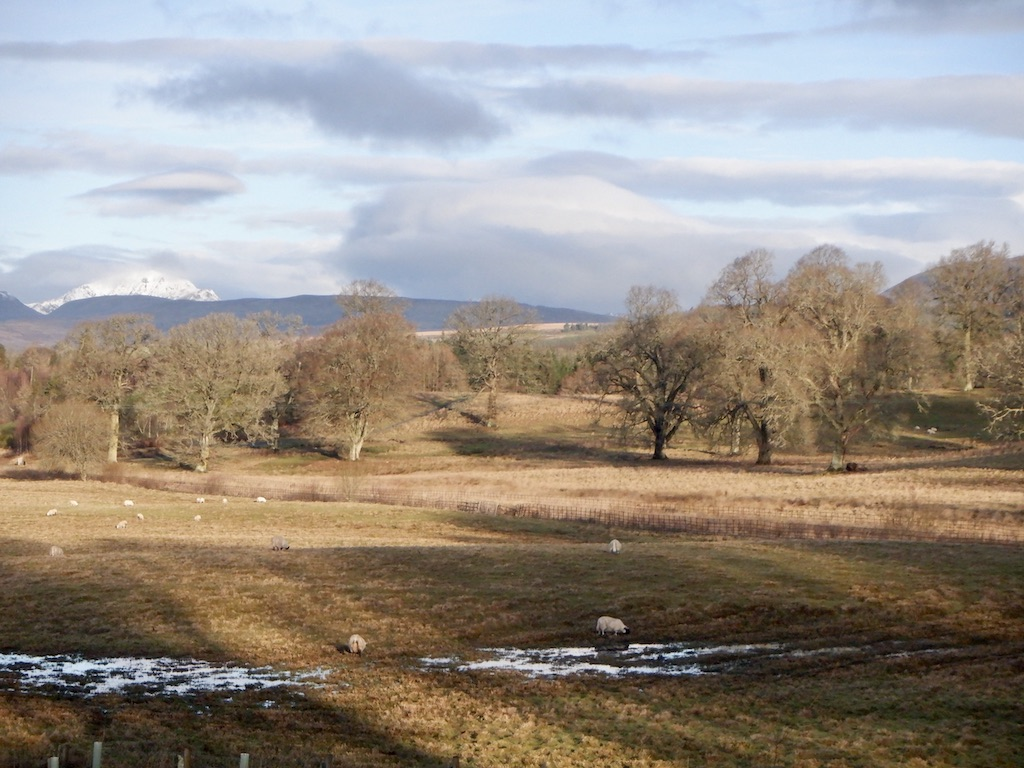
Parkland, Lanrick Castle

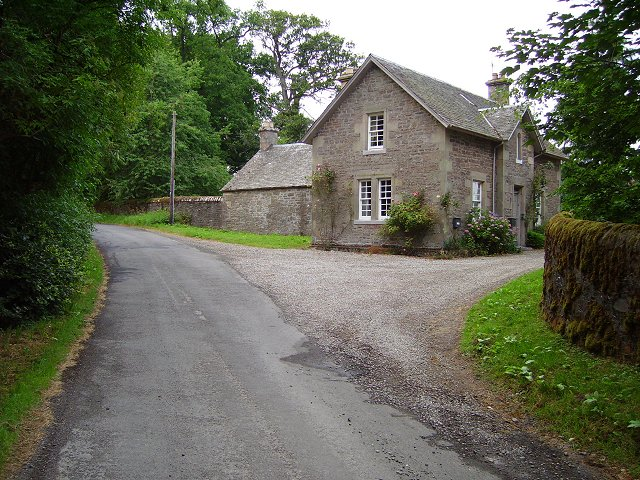
Lodge, Lanrick Castle
