= Cambusnethan House =

Coordinates: 55°45′21″N 03°56′44″W

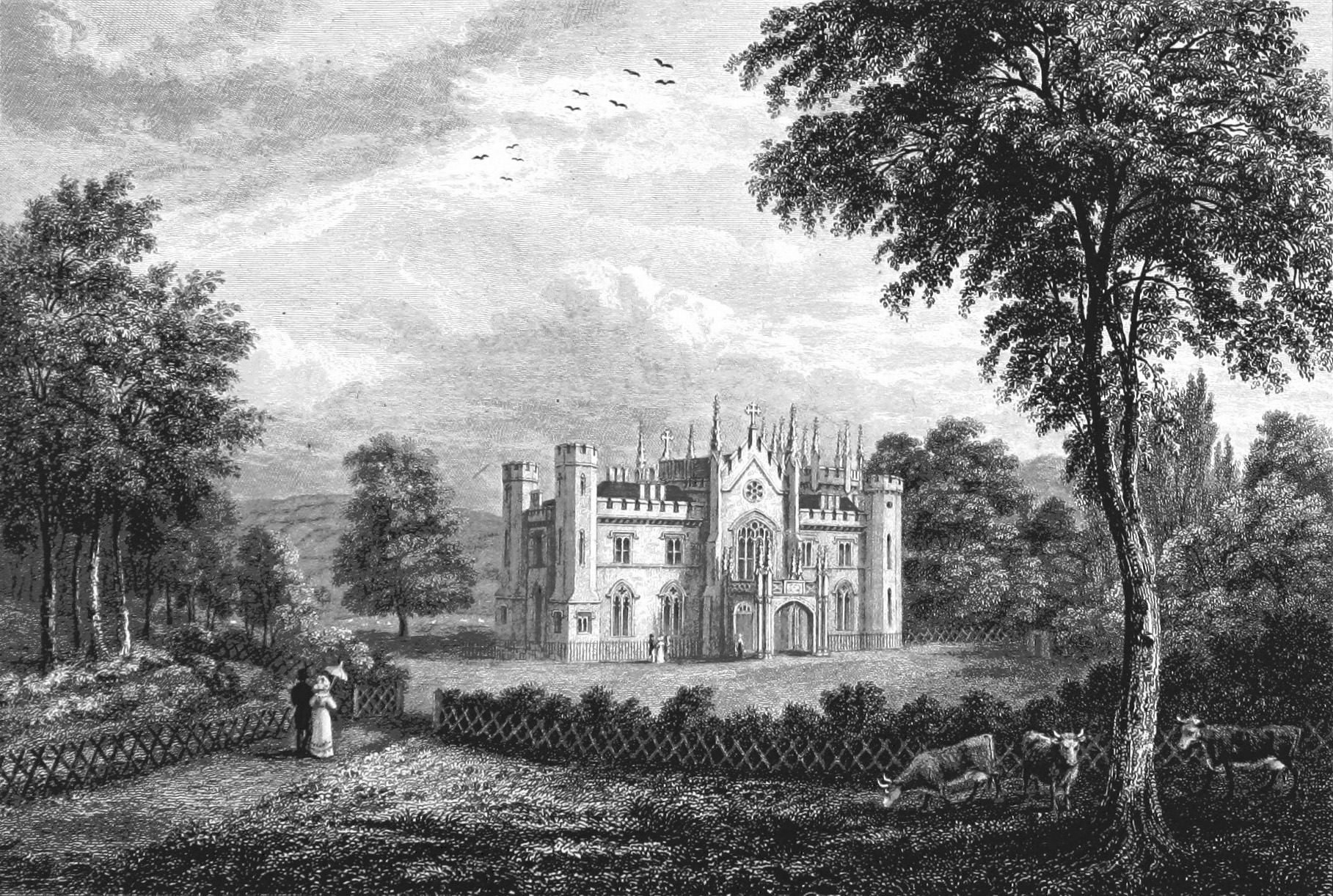
Fleming Printing, Edinburgh, 1830

Cambusnethan House, or Cambusnethan Priory, in North Lanarkshire, Scotland, was designed by James Gillespie Graham and completed in 1820. It is listed on the Buildings at Risk Register for Scotland as a building facing "critical" risk, having been damaged by fire in the 1980s and since vandalized.

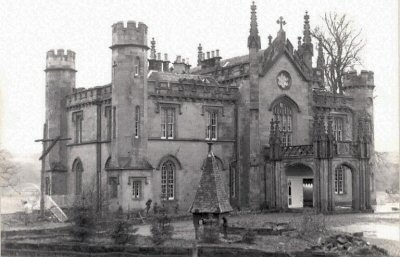
Exterior in 1825

It is generally regarded as being the best remaining example of a Graham-built country house in the quasi-ecclesiastical style of the Gothic Revival. It was rented for a short number of years in the early 1960s as an architects office for the team who built the 60s part of Livingston, Scotland. Later it was used as a hotel and restaurant and "mediaeval banqueting hall", the last use being tenuously linked with William Finnemund, the 12th century, Laird of Cambusnethan.

There was originally a Norman tower house near the site of the present building, and this was replaced by a manor house during the 17th century. The manor house burned down in March 1816, and the present house was commissioned and built in 1820.

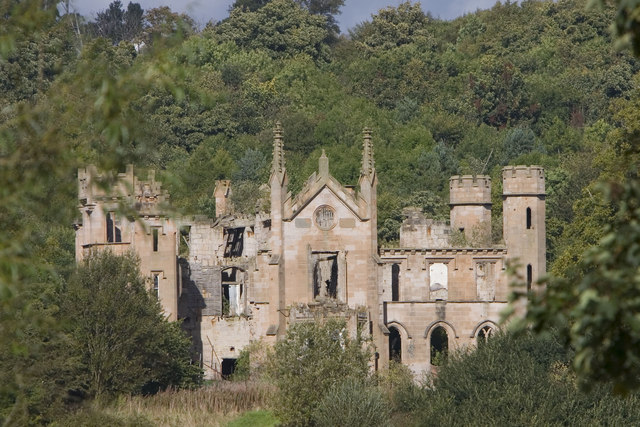
Exterior in 2005

The Priory was built for the Lockharts of Lee from Castlehill, Auchenglen, in South Lanarkshire. The family's coat of arms is carved above the main entrance and etched in every balustrade of the main staircase inside. The arms represents a casket, heart and lock and derives from the tradition that the ancestors of this family carried Robert the Bruce's heart back from the Holy Land. The nearby Cambusnethan Manse (now Elaina Nursing Home, Netherton) was also the birthplace of John Gibson Lockhart, Sir Walter Scott's biographer and later son in law.

The Priory was established on the Parish of Cam(bus)nethan, with the parish church standing on the banks of the River Clyde, in the countryside near the modern neighbourhoods of Netherton and Gowkthrapple.

There are few remaining examples of early 19th-century Neo-Gothic mansions remaining in Scotland as many were demolished in the late 1950s and 1960s. Cambusnethan House is a notable building in its own right as a good example of the neo-Gothic style, and also because so few buildings of this type still remain.

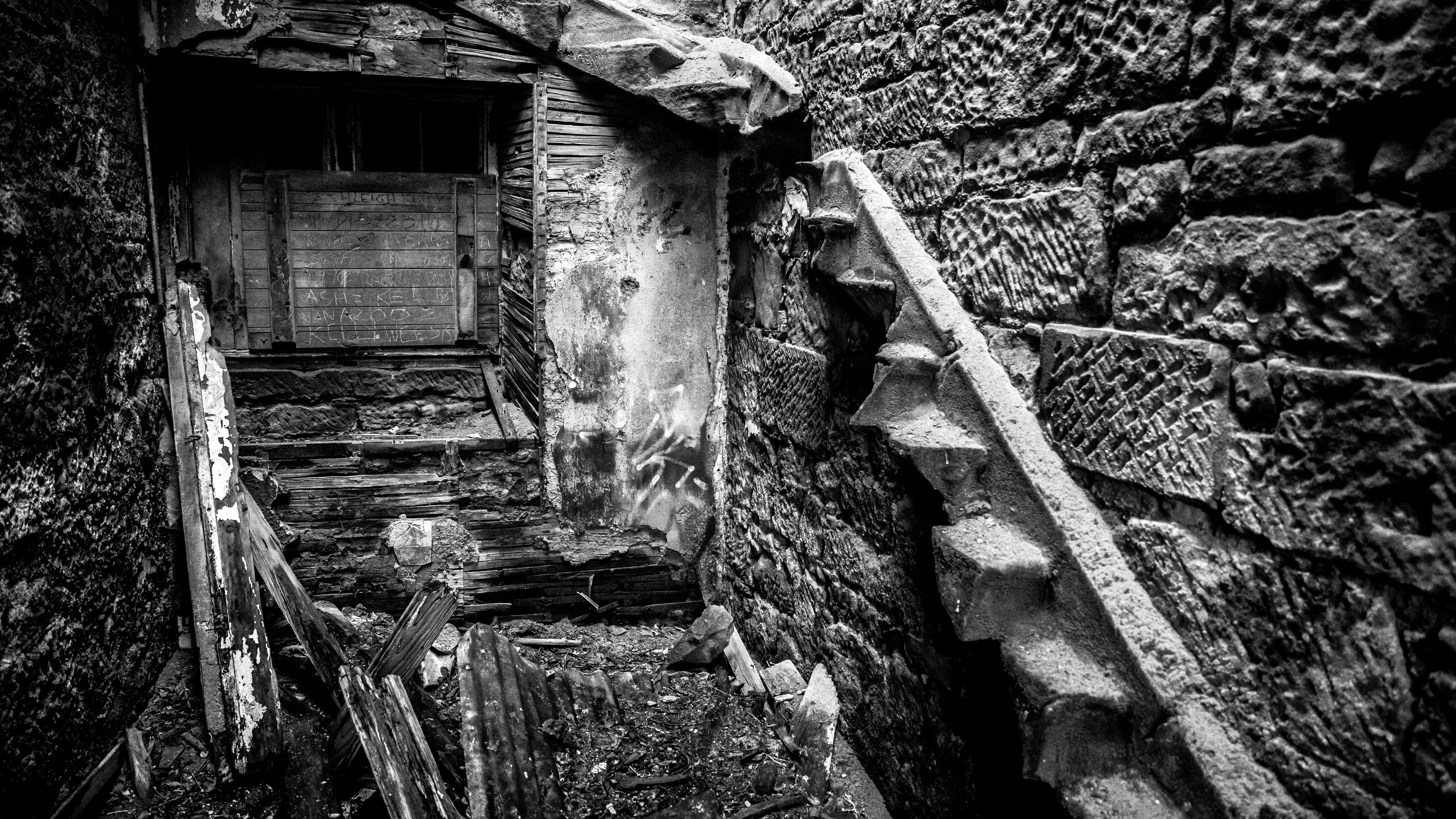
A collapsed stairwell inside the Priory.

The house is two and three storeys high with turrets at each corner, a three-storey bow in the west elevation and a massive square porch. Characteristically, the house was very ornately decorated with a variety of architectural details; castellated roof lines, scrolled pinnacles, narrow pointed windows and drip moulds, and various cornices, besides carved motifs and decorated chimneys. Some of the ornate pinnacles have been removed in the interest of safety, and there had been at a recent extension to the lower ground floor across a sunken passage across the house with a roof flush with ground level.

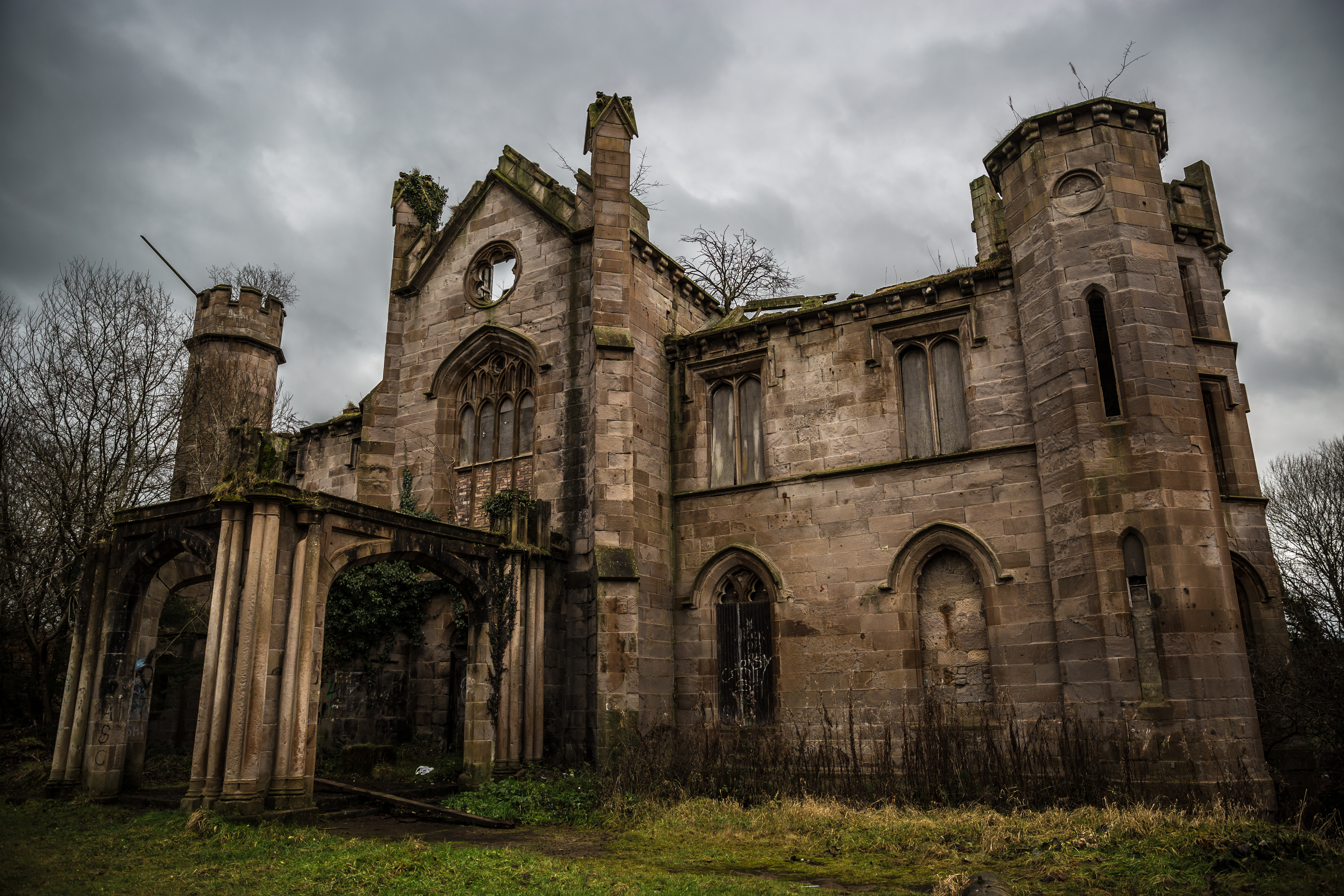
Cambusnethan Priory in December 2016.

== At risk ==
Use of the building ended in 1984, and the building has fallen prey to vandalism and fire. The building is listed as At Risk by the Scottish Civic Trust but is already in derelict condition.

== Rescue bid ==
In March 2014 the "Friends of Cambusnethan Priory" was established, with the aim of saving the building from further deterioration.
