= James Gillespie Graham =

Scottish architect (1776-1855)

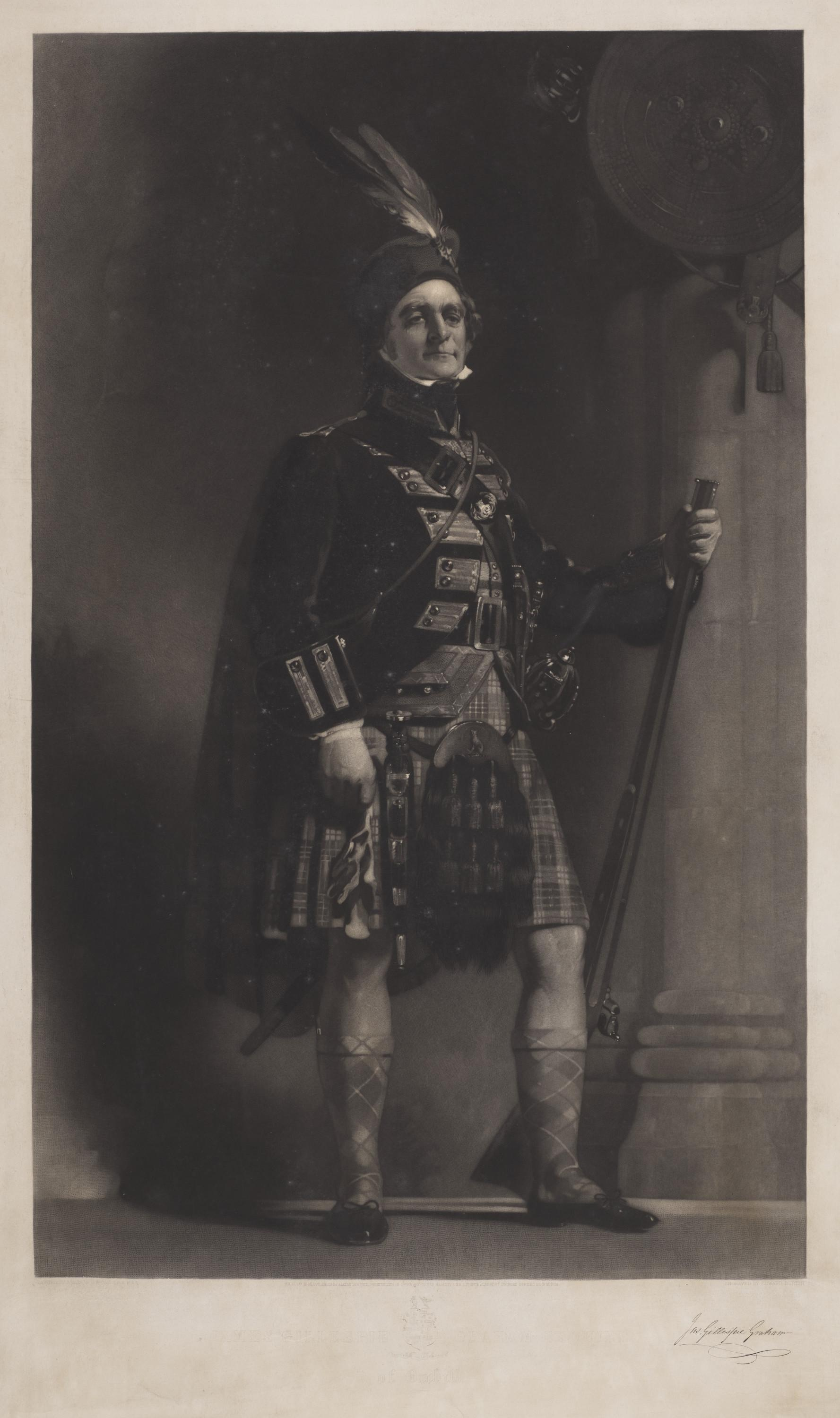
James Gillespie Graham by Edward Burton

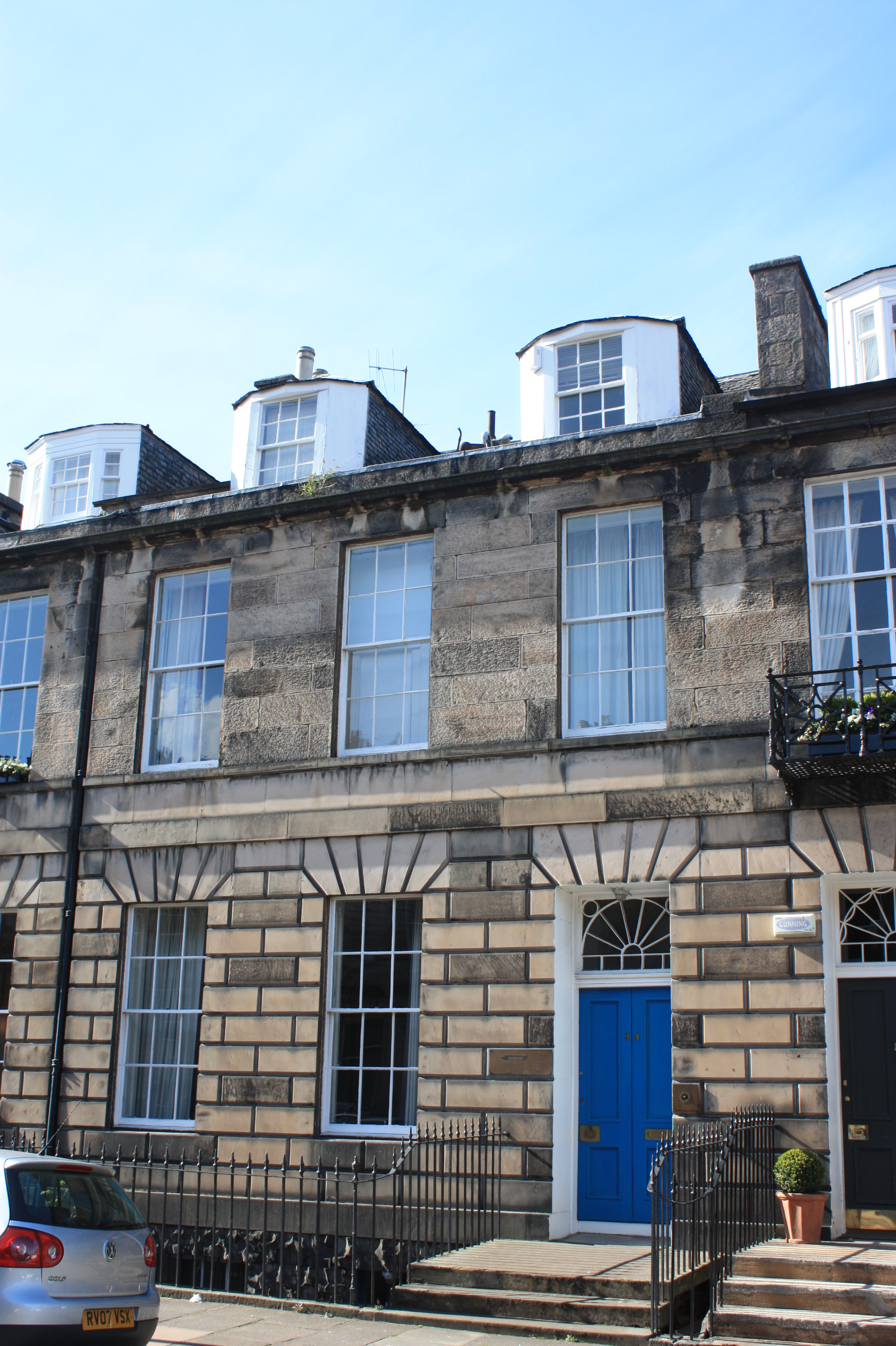
James Gillespie Graham's Edinburgh townhouse, at 34 Albany Street

James Gillespie Graham (11 June 1776 – 21 March 1855) was a Scottish architect, prominent in the early 19th century. Much of his work was Scottish baronial in style. A prominent example is Ayton Castle. He also worked in the Gothic Revival style, in which he was heavily influenced by the work of Augustus Pugin. However, he also worked successfully in the neoclassical style as exemplified in his design of Blythswood House at Renfrew seven miles down the River Clyde from Glasgow. Graham designed principally country houses and churches. He is also well known for his interior design, his most noted work in this respect being that at Taymouth Castle and Hopetoun House.

== Life ==
Graham was born in Dunblane on 11 June 1776. He was the son of Malcolm Gillespie, a solicitor. He was christened as James Gillespie. His initial work was as a joiner before he became an architect.

In 1810, under the name James Gillespie, he was living in a flat at 10 Union Street at the head of Leith Walk in Edinburgh. In 1810, he also designed Culdee Castle at Muthill (he would also design the nearby Muthill Parish Church in 1826). In 1814, Graham designed St Andrew's Cathedral in Glasgow (built 1817).

In 1817, Alexander Macdonald, a member of Clan Macdonald of Clanranald, engaged Graham to design the Glenfinnan Monument, a stone tower to commemorate the Highlanders who fought on the side of Charles Edward Stuart during the Jacobite rising of 1745. The tower was completed shortly after Macdonald's death but debts were left outstanding to Graham. Graham had designed other buildings for Clan Macdonald including Arisaig Church (1809) and Arisaig Glen House (since demolished).

Graham worked with Pugin on a number of projects as they were friends and Pugin had an engraved set of drawing compasses with Graham's name. Two projects they collaborated on together included the design of Murthly House (1829 to 1831) and works at Taymouth Castle (1837 to 1842).

Some of his principal churches include St Andrew's Cathedral in Glasgow, and St Mary's Roman Catholic Cathedral and the Highland Tolbooth Church (now The Hub) in Edinburgh. His houses include Cambusnethan House in Lanarkshire.

He was responsible for laying out the Moray Estate of Edinburgh's New Town, and for the design of Hamilton Square and adjoining streets in the New Town of Birkenhead, England, for William Laird, brother-in-law of William Harley, major developer of the New Town upon Blythswood Hill in Glasgow. According to the writer Frank Arneil Walker he may have been responsible for the remodelling of Johnstone Castle, Renfrewshire.

He was elected a fellow of the Society of Antiquaries of Scotland on 24 March 1817. He designed and built a house at 34 Albany Street in Edinburgh's New Town for himself and his wife and lived there from 1817 to 1833.

He died in Edinburgh at his residence on York Place on 21 March 1855 after a four-year illness.

He is buried in the sealed south-west section of Greyfriars Kirkyard generally called the Covenanter's Prison together with his wife and other family members.

== Family ==
In 1815 he married Margaret Ann Graham, daughter of a wealthy landowner, William Graham of Orchill (d.1825) in Perthshire. ON His marriage he assumed the surname Graham of his wife's family. Together they had two daughters. In 1825, on the death of his wife's father, the couple inherited his large country estate, and James thereafter became known as James Gillespie Graham.

His wife died in 1826, and he married again, to Elizabeth Campbell, daughter of Major John Campbell of the 76th Regiment of Foot.

== Principal works ==
see

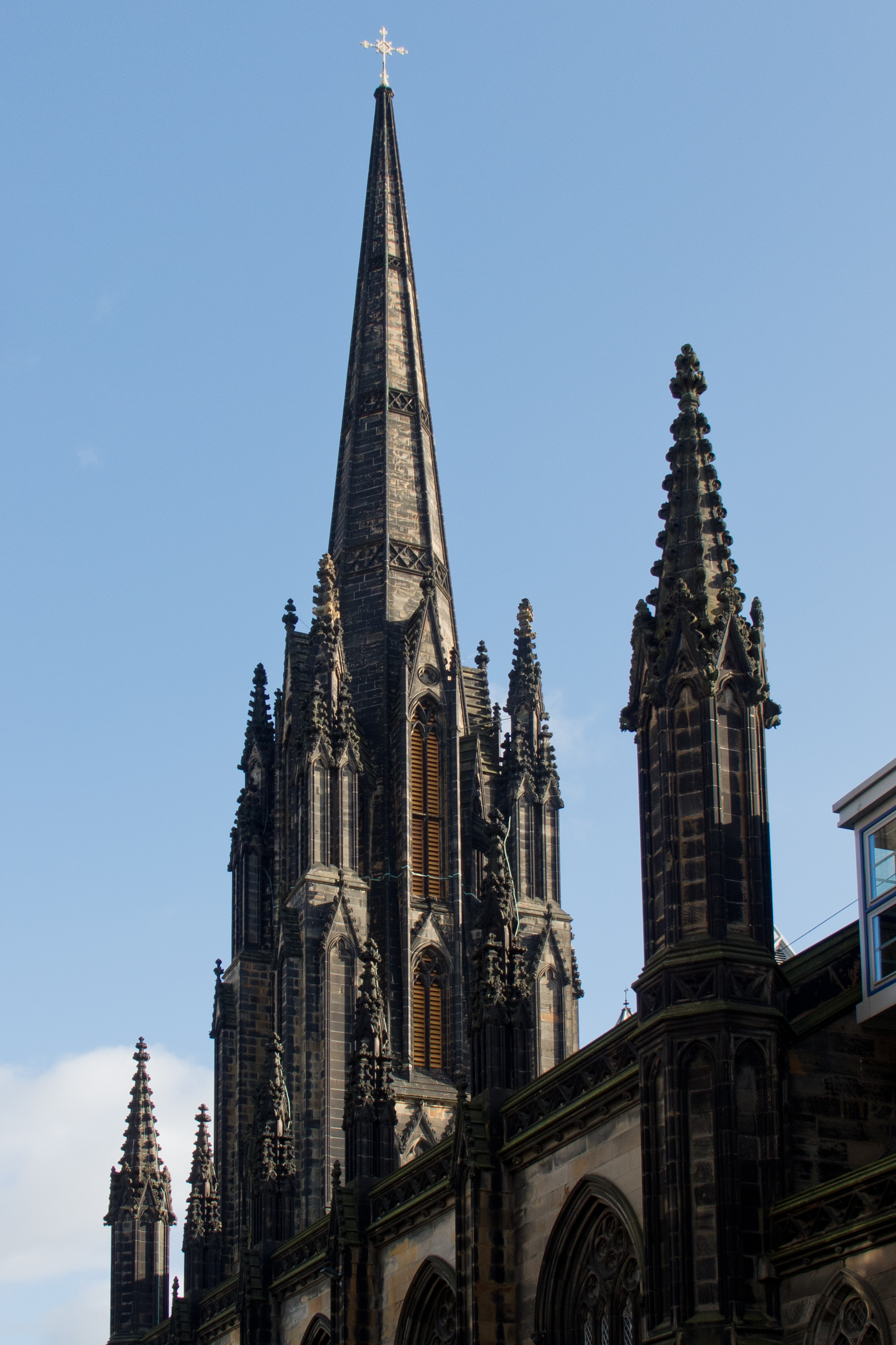
Tolbooth Kirk Edinburgh

The west front of Crawford Priory as it is today

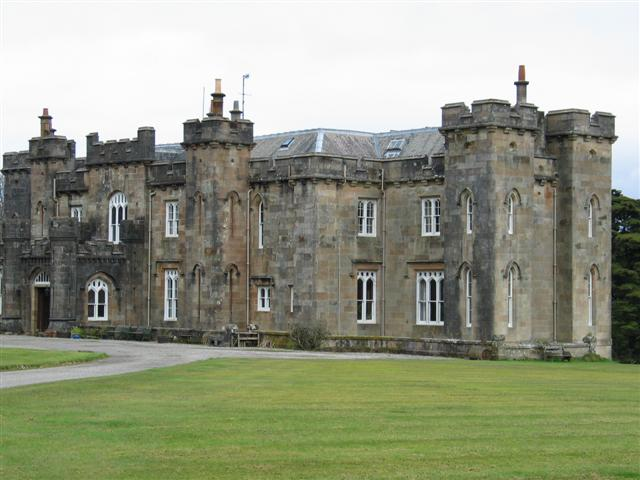
Torrisdale Castle

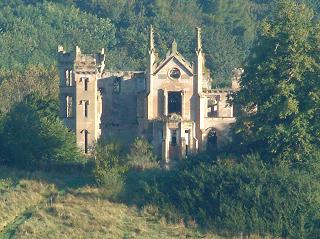
Cambusnethan Priory

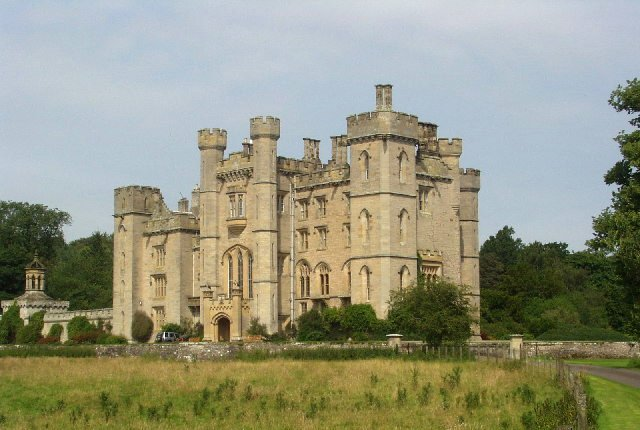
Duns Castle

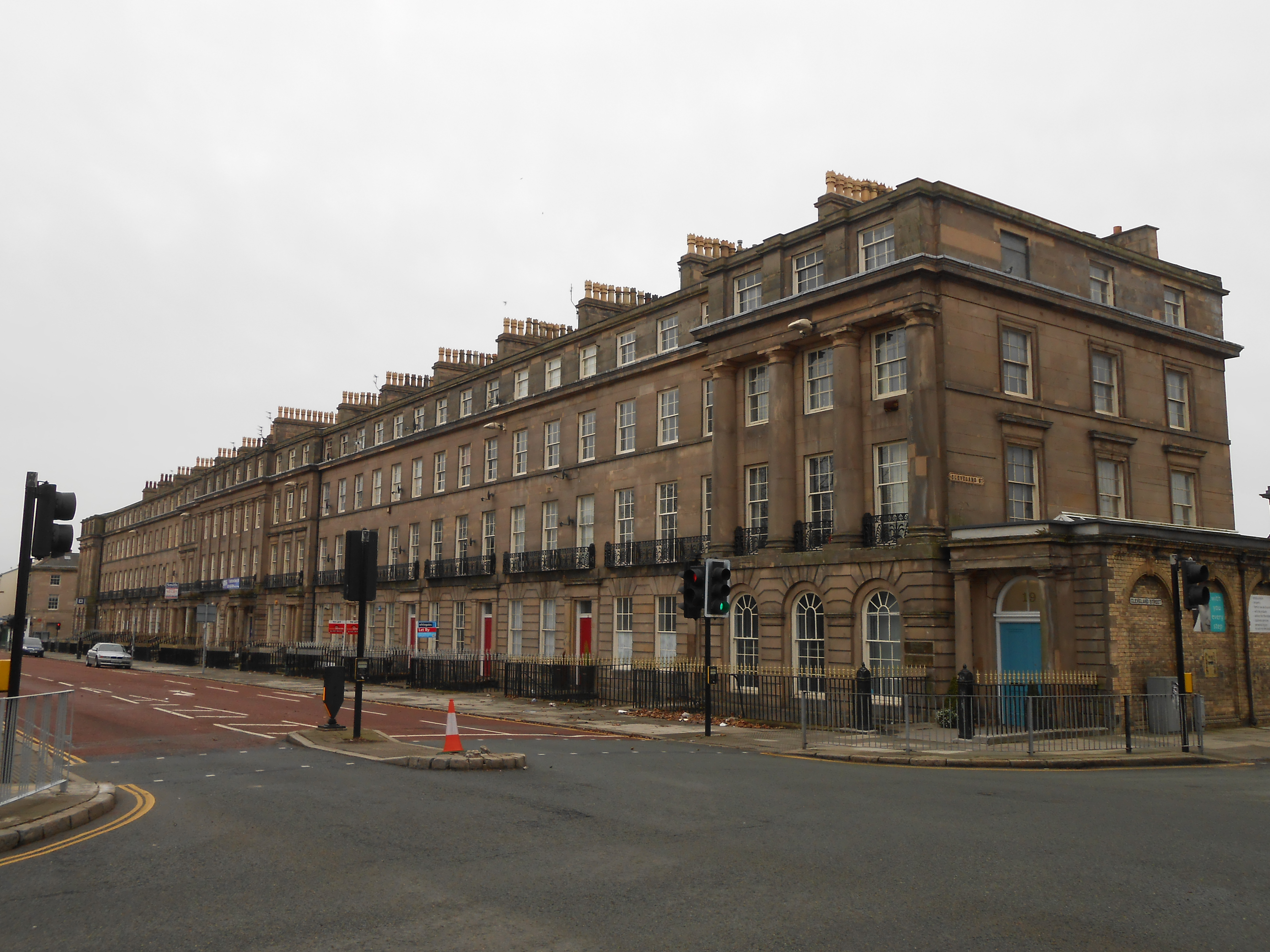
19–34 Hamilton Square, Birkenhead

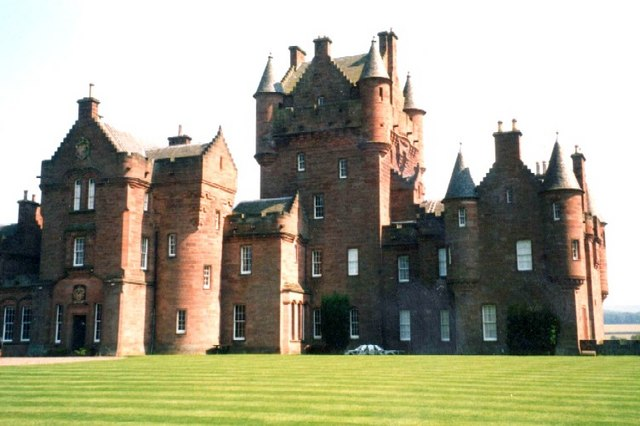
Ayton Castle

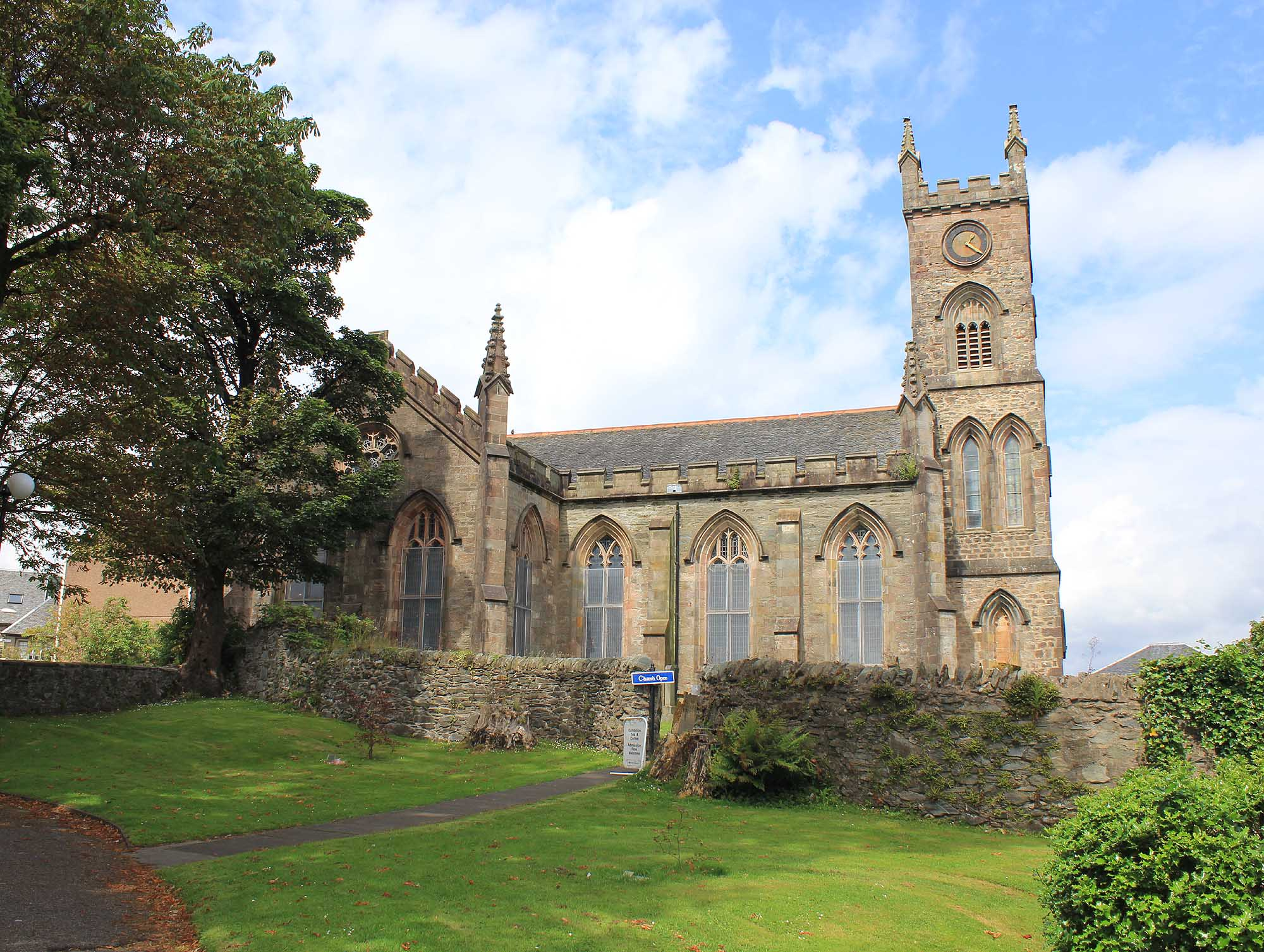
High Kirk, Dunoon

Graham's Blythswood House, Glasgow. Home of the Lords Blythswood; it was demolished in 1935.

- Snizort Parish Church and manse (1800/1802)
- Achnacarry House, Inverness-shire (1800) (completed by William Burn)
- Alterations in the Gothic style, Lanrick Castle (1803)
- New Kilpatrick Parish Church, Bearsden (1807)
- A grand crescent of townhouses, Warriston Crescent, Edinburgh (1807, resumed 1817)
- Arisaig Church (1809) and Arisaig Glen House (since demolished)
- Cupar County Buildings (1810)
- Drumtochty Castle (1810)
- Falkirk Parish Church (1810)
- Culdees Castle, Muthill (1810)
- Sleat Manse, Skye (1810)
- Fife County Prison, Cupar (1811)
- Crawford Priory (1811)
- Steeple of Monimail Church (1811)
- Enlargement of Cameron House, Loch Lomond (1812)
- Candleford House (1812)
- Completion of Eredine House (1812)
- Monument to Henry Dundas, 1st Viscount Melville, Comrie (1812)
- Auchtertool Parish Church (1812)
- Bowland House, Stow of Wedale (1813)
- St Andrew's Cathedral, Glasgow (1814)
- Clackmannan Parish Church (1815)
- Gray's Hospital, Elgin (1815)
- Liberton Parish Church (1815)
- Edmonstone Castle near Biggar (1815)
- Enlargement of Glenbarr Abbey (1815)
- Torrisdale Castle (1815)
- Glenfinnan Monument (1815)
- Cambusnethan Priory (1816)
- Inverary Courthouse (1816)
- High Kirk, Dunoon (1816)
- Keith Parish Church (1816)
- The Market House, Duns (1816)
- Channelkirk Church (1816)
- Remodelling of Dunblane Cathedral (1817)
- St Mungo's Parish Church, Alloa (1817)
- Blythswood House, Renfrew, (1818) demolished, for the owners of the Lands of Blythswood, Glasgow
- Drimsynie House, Lochgoilhead (1818) for the Campbells of Blythswood
- Restoration of the Church of the Holy Rude, Stirling (1818)
- Dunbar Parish Church (1818)
- Remodelling of Duns Castle (1818)
- Logie Easter Parish Church (1818)
- George Street Independent Church, Glasgow (1819)
- Nicolson Street Church, Edinburgh (1819) interior and roof lost to a fire in 1930s
- Mar and Kellie mausoleum Alloa (1819)
- Layout of Blythswood Square in Glasgow (1820) for William Harley
- Manse at Kinloss (1820)
- Lee Castle, Carnwath (1820)
- Mountquhanie, Kilmany, Fife (1820)
- Kirkwall School (1820)
- Enlargement of Allanton Castle, Cambusnethan (1820)
- Kilmaron Castle (1820)
- Terrace of large townhouses, 1-11 Albyn Place, Edinburgh (1822)
- Terrace of large townhouses, 1-11 St Colme Street, Edinburgh (1822)
- Huge crescent of terraced houses, 1-36 Moray Place, Edinburgh (1822)
- Crescent of houses and flats, 1-8 Randolph Crescent (1822)
- Kersfield, Berwickshire (1822)
- Kilmadock Parish Church, Doune (1822)
- Mausoleum, Springwood Park, Kelso (1822)
- Dormont near Dalton, Dumfriesshire (1823)
- Dunninald Castle (1823)
- Terraces houses, Alva Street, Edinburgh (1823)
- Hamilton Square, Birkenhead for the Laird family from Greenock (1824)
- Leith Tolbooth, Tolbooth Wynd, Edinburgh (1824) demolished to build Council housing
- St John's Kirk, Perth (1825; reduction of north transept)
- Layout of Blacket Place, Edinburgh (1825)
- Enlargement of Wishaw House (1825)
- Layout of Melville Street and Walker Street, Edinburgh (1825)
- Rafford Parish Church (1825)
- Dunino Parish Church (1826)
- Enlargement of Inverkeithing Parish Church (1826)
- Morham Manse, Haddington (1826)
- Muthill Church (1826)
- Commercial Bank, Inverness (1827)
- Quality Street, Mutton Hole, now called Davidsons Mains, Edinburgh (1827)
- Manse, Douglas, Lanarkshire (1828)
- Murthly House near Dunkeld (1829)
- 18 to 20 Queensferry Street, Edinburgh (1830)
- Ardhmor House, Dalgety Bay (1830)
- Dalgety Kirk, Dalgety Bay (1830)
- Spire on Haddington Town House, Haddington (1830)
- Errol Parish Church (1830)
- Steeple on Montrose Old Church (1831)
- Chapel at St Margarets Convent, Whitehouse Loan, Edinburgh (1834)
- Bolfracks near Aberfeldy (1835)
- Commercial Bank, Aberdeen (1836)
- Greenside Parish Church, Edinburgh (1836)
- Ardmaddy Castle (designed 1837, executed after death)
- Chapel interior, George Heriot's School (1837)
- Remodelling of Taymouth Castle (1838)
- Remodelling of Kinglassie Parish Church (1839)
- Tolbooth Church, Castlehill, Edinburgh (1839) now known as The Hub
- Remodelling of Brodick Castle (1844)
- Episcopal Chapel, Gask (1845)
- Ayton Castle (1846)
- Wester Bogie House, Abbotshall, Fife (1850)

== See also ==
Media related to James Gillespie Graham at Wikimedia Commons

- Category:James Gillespie Graham buildings

== External sources ==
- The Glasgow Story retrieved 8 October 2007.
- James Gillespie Graham retrieved 8 October 2007.
