= Albert Bruce-Joy =

Irish sculptor

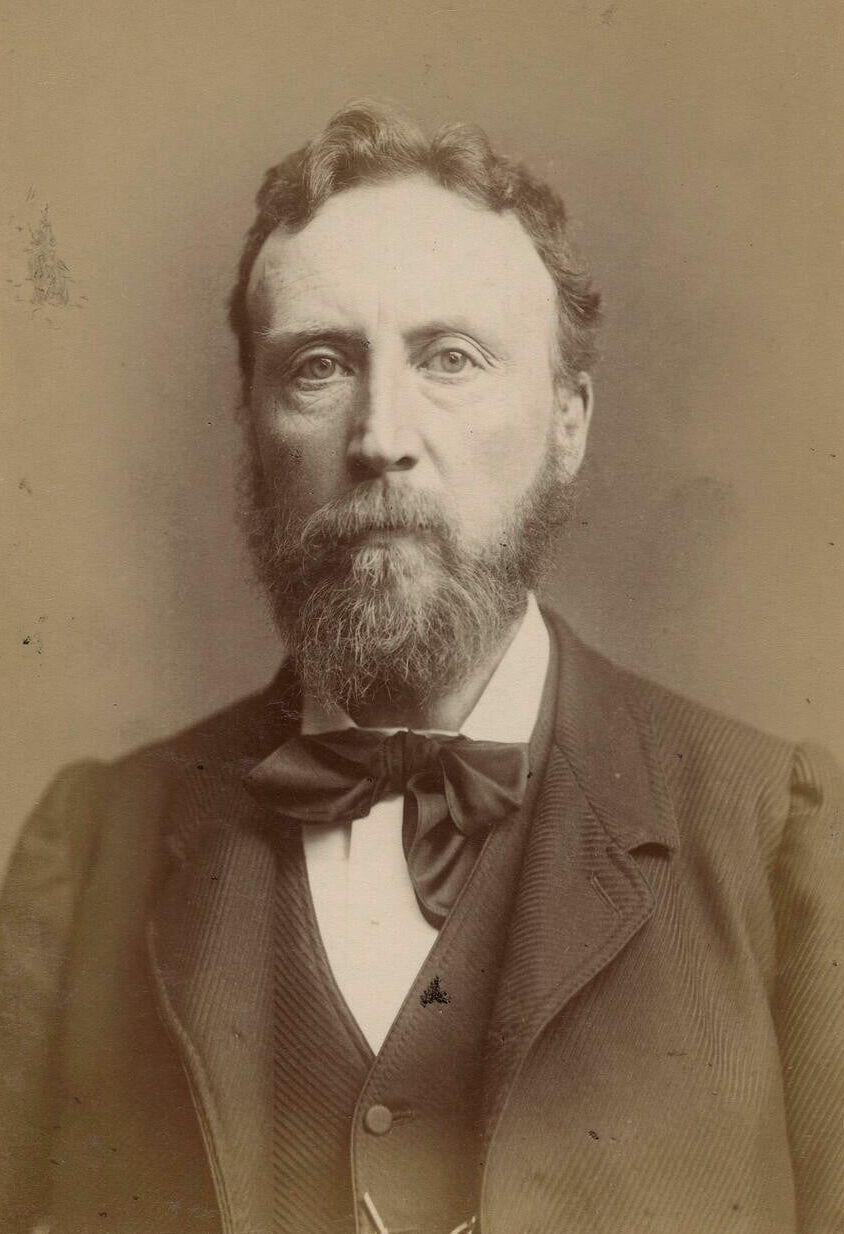
- Bruce-Joy c. 1890
- Born: 21 August 1842; Dublin, Ireland
- Died: 22 July 1924; Shottermill, England
- Known for: Sculpture

Albert Bruce-Joy (21 August 1842 – 22 July 1924) was an Irish sculptor working in England. His original surname was Joy but he became known under his hyphenated name Bruce-Joy later in life. He was the brother of the painter George W. Joy.

== Biography ==
Son of William Bruce Joy, MD, Bruce-Joy was born in Dublin but educated in Offenbach am Main, Paris and at King's College London.

He trained as a sculptor with John Henry Foley at the National Art Training School, South Kensington, and the Royal Academy Schools. He began exhibiting at the Royal Academy from 1866 onwards. In 1867 he gave an address in Rome where he is said to have spent three years.

After his return to London, Bruce-Joy took over the commission for a statue of Robert James Graves for the Royal College of Physicians in Dublin. This was originally given to the late John Foley (died 1874) who had previously finished three statues for the College. This marked the start of his specialisation in portrait statues, busts and medallions which were praised at the time for their likeness, and for which he is now mostly known.

Bruce-Joy built his house in Shottermill near Haslemere in 1891, and travelled to America twice in his life.

== Works ==
(a detailed list is given at the University of Glasgow's database)

- Statue of John Laird (1877) in Birkenhead.
- Statue of William Harvey (1878), Surgeon, The Leas, Folkestone, Kent.
- Statue of James Whiteside (1880) in St Patrick's Cathedral, Dublin.
- Monument known as the Ayer Lion (1880) sculpted from Italian marble for the grave site of James Cook Ayer in Lowell Cemetery, Lowell, Massachusetts. The cemetery website gives a date of 1888 for the commission.
- Statue of Gladstone (1882) in front of Bow Church, Bow, London.
- Statues of John Bright (1891), and Oliver Heywood (1894) in Albert Square, Manchester.
- Statue of Alexander Balfour (1905) in St John's Gardens, Liverpool.
- The Victoria and Albert Museum in London holds three marble busts by Bruce-Joy, including Sunshine which was shown at the Royal Academy in 1866.

== Gallery ==
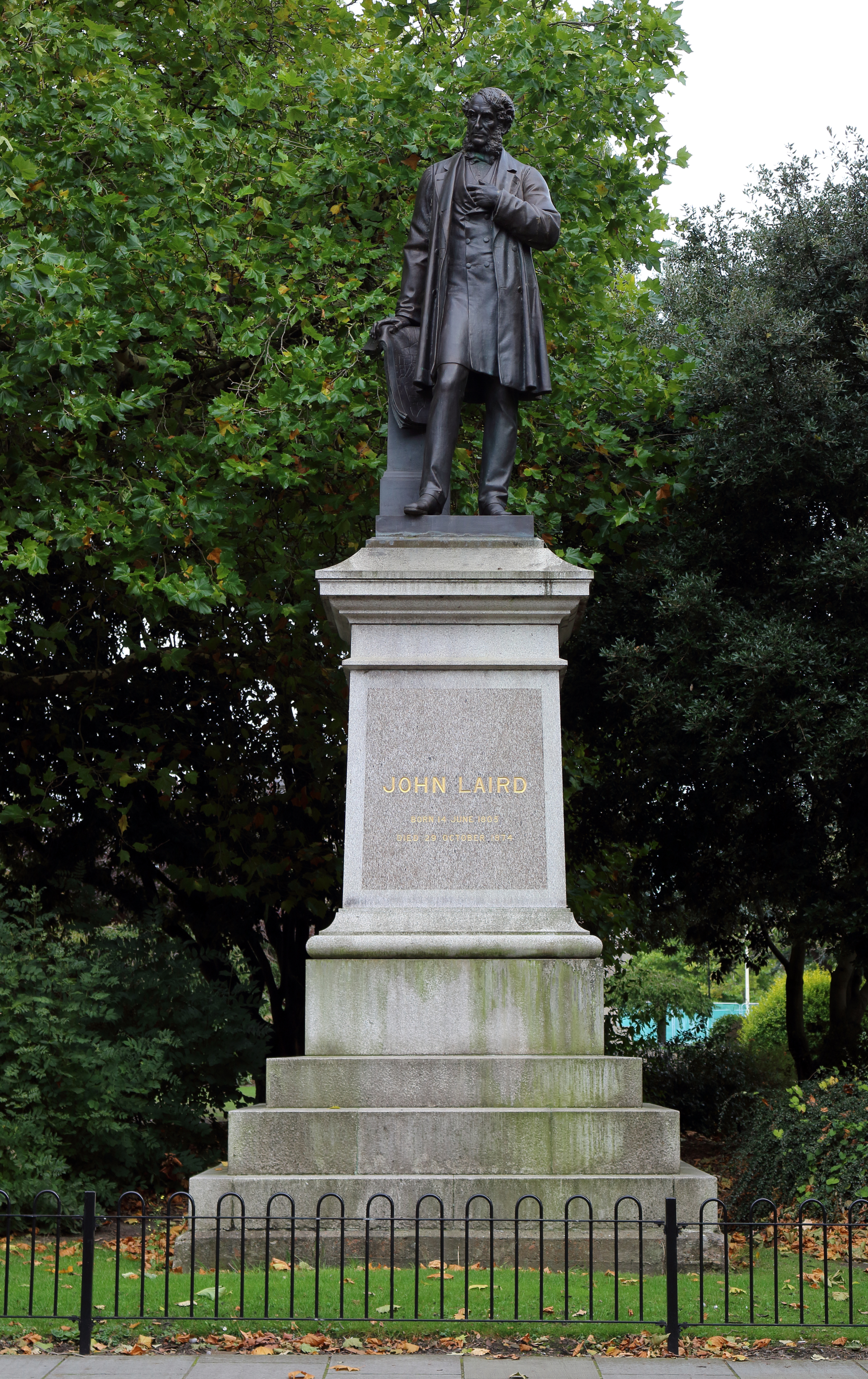
John Laird in Hamilton Square, Birkenhead

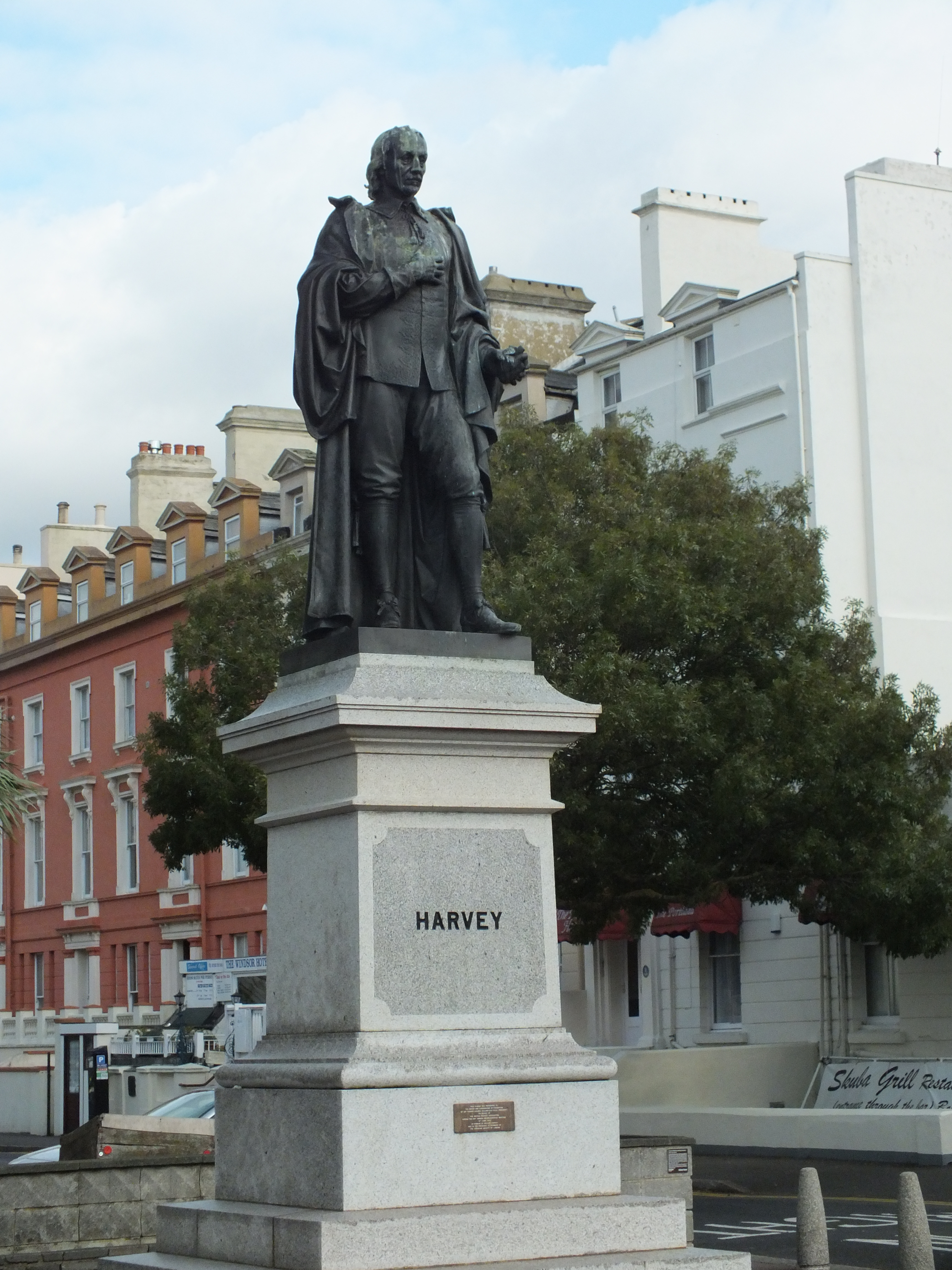
William Harvey in Folkestone, Kent

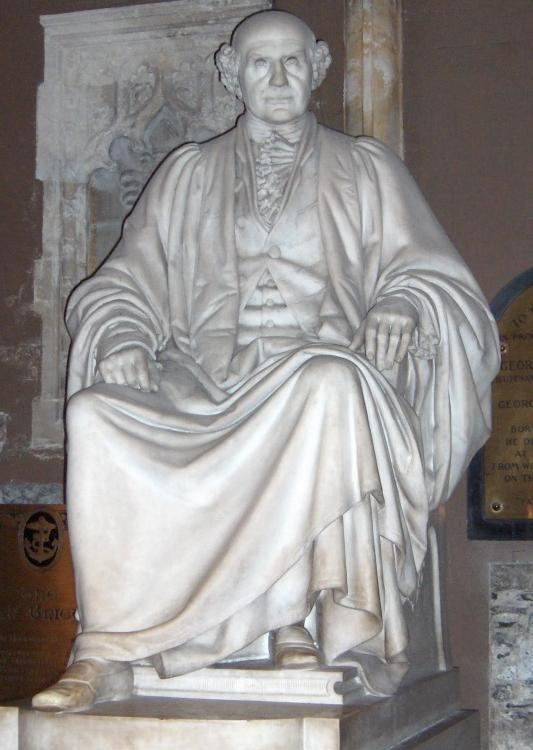
James Whiteside in St Patrick's Cathedral, Dublin

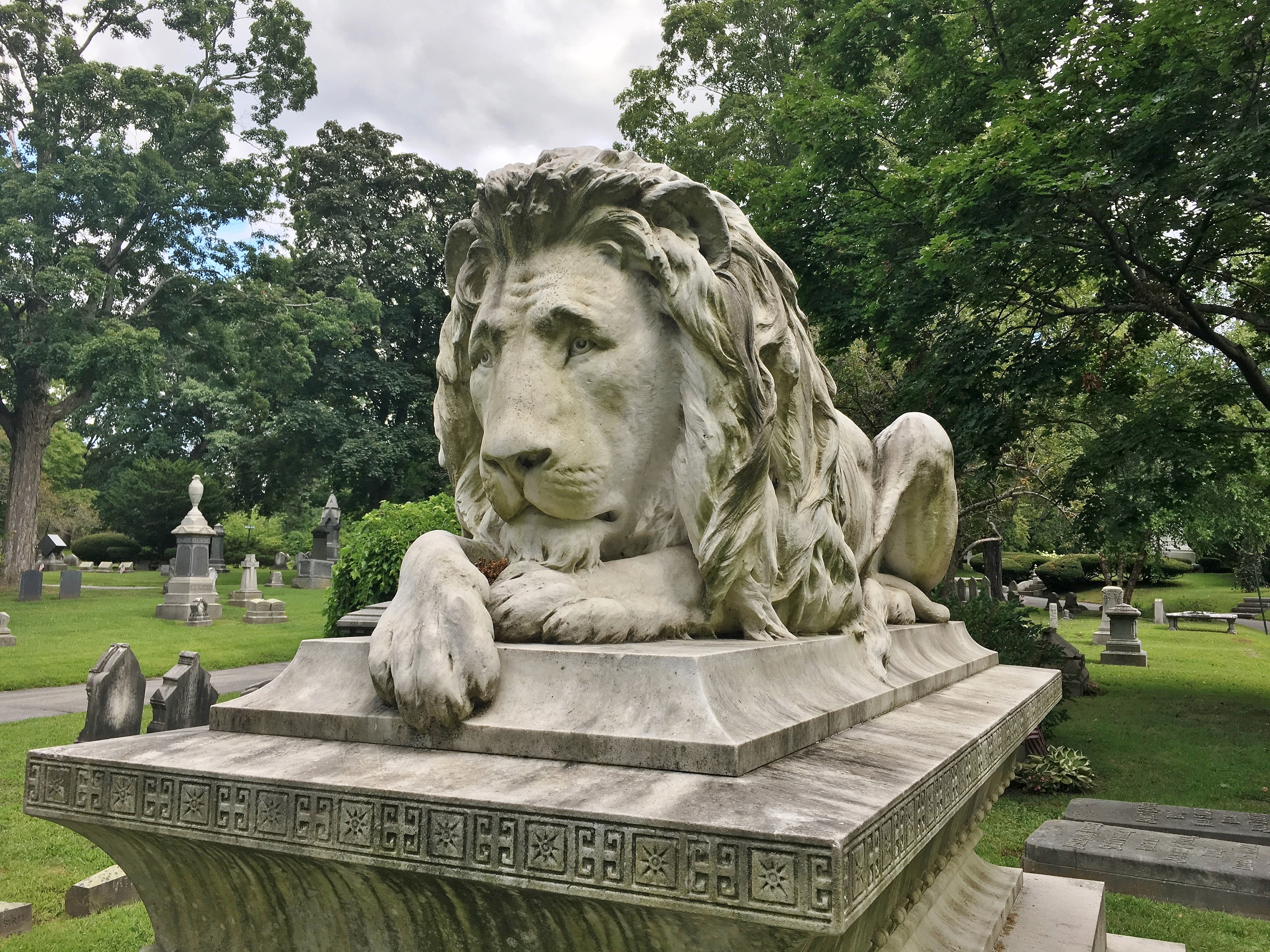
Ayer Lion, Lowell Cemetery, Massachusetts

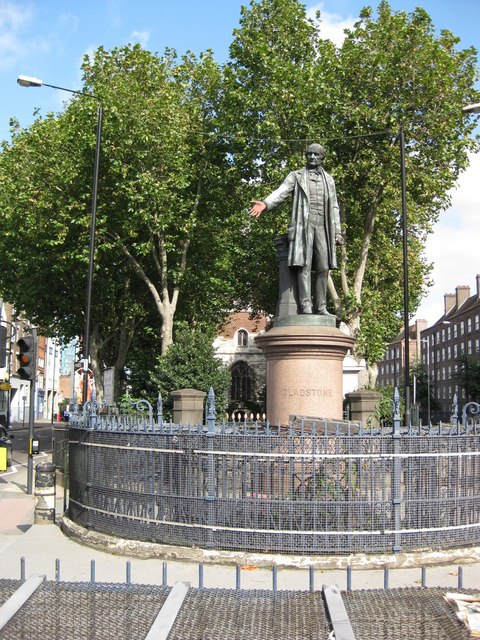
Statue of Gladstone in Bow, London

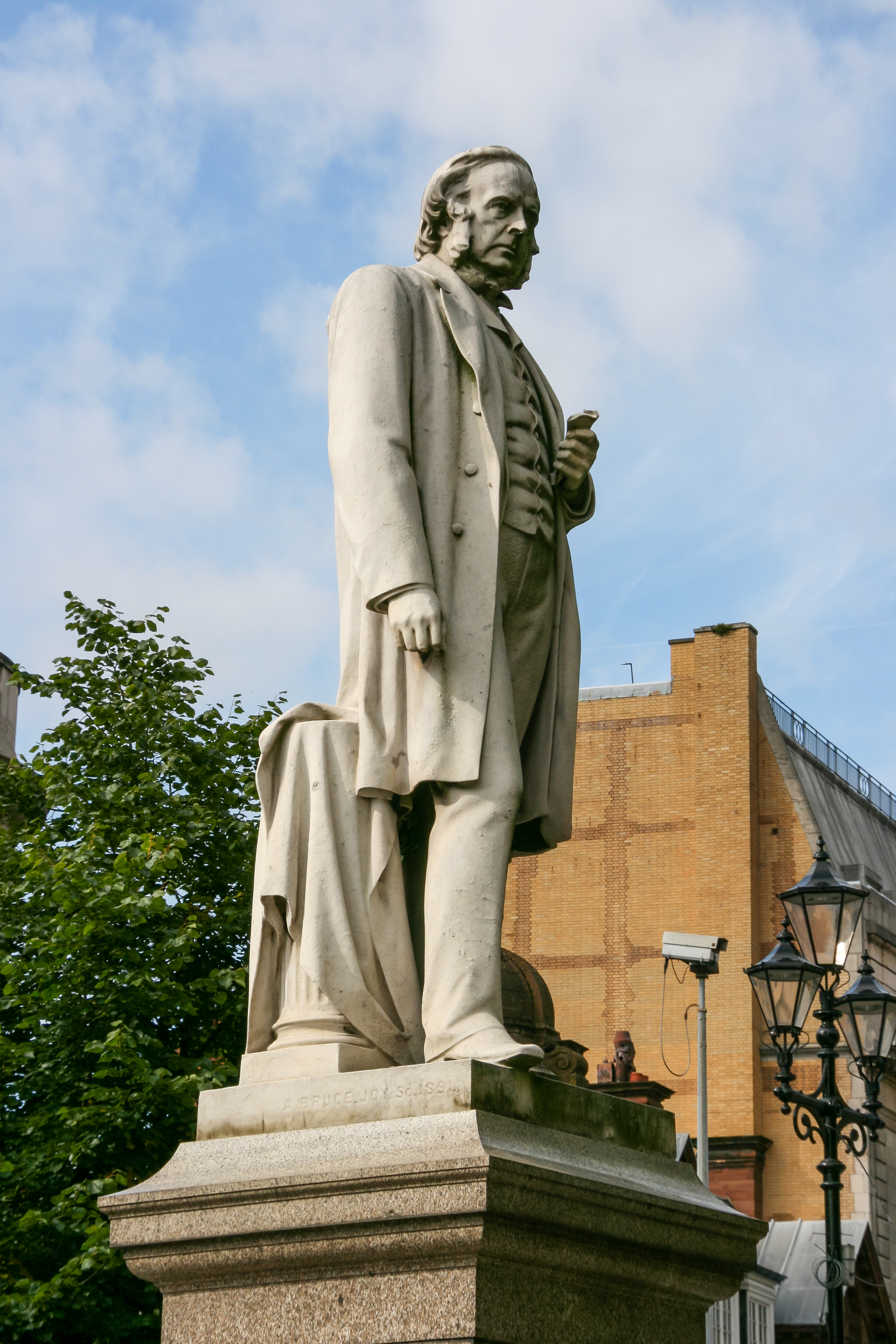
John Bright in Manchester's Albert Square

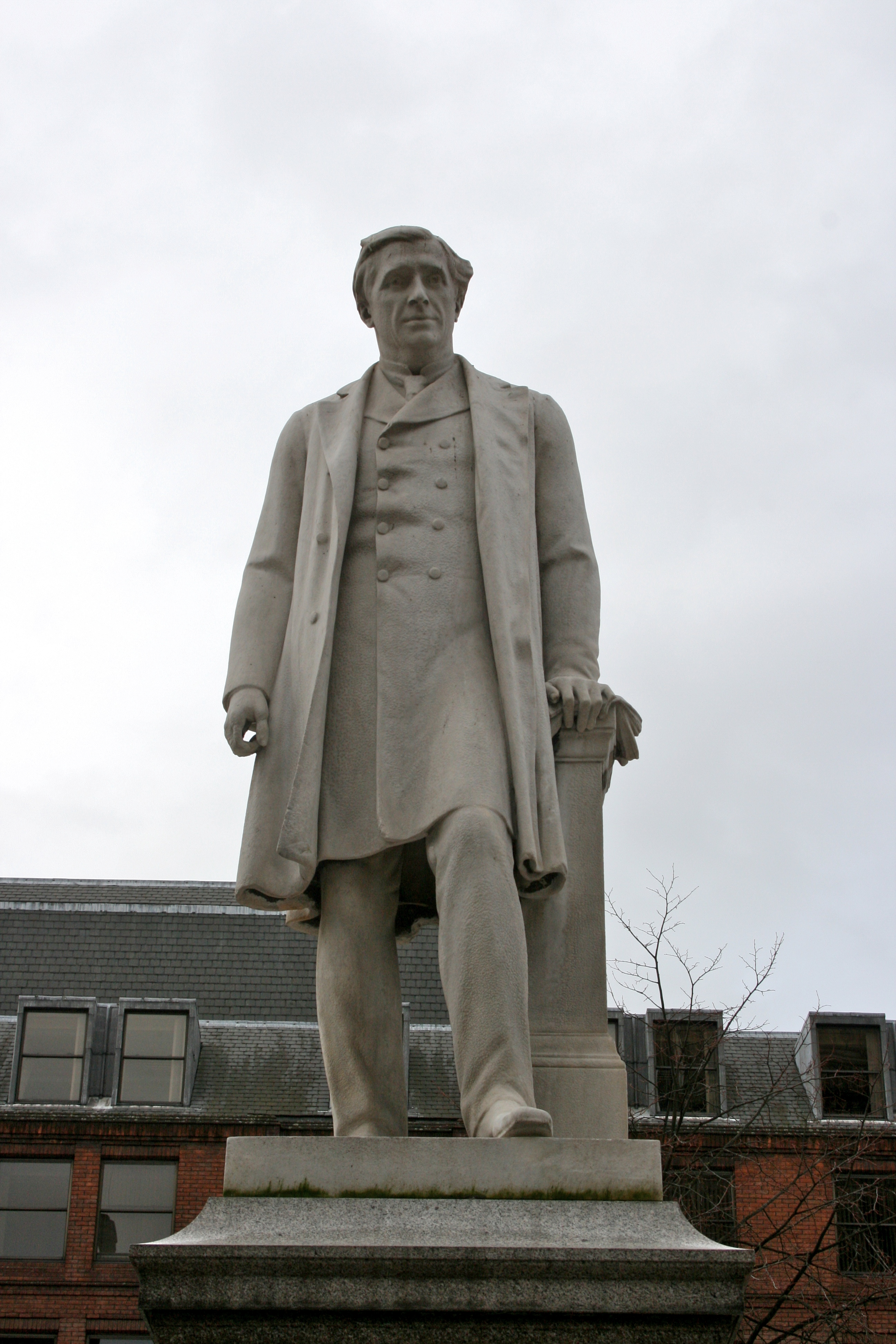
Oliver Heywood in Manchester's Albert Square

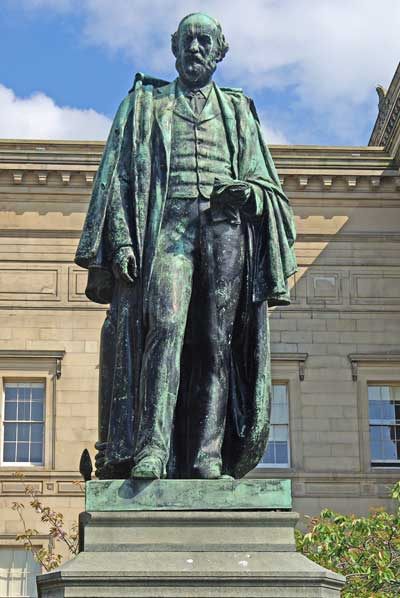
Alexander Balfour in St John's Gardens, Liverpool
