= High Kirk, Dunoon =

High Kirk
- Old Parish Church
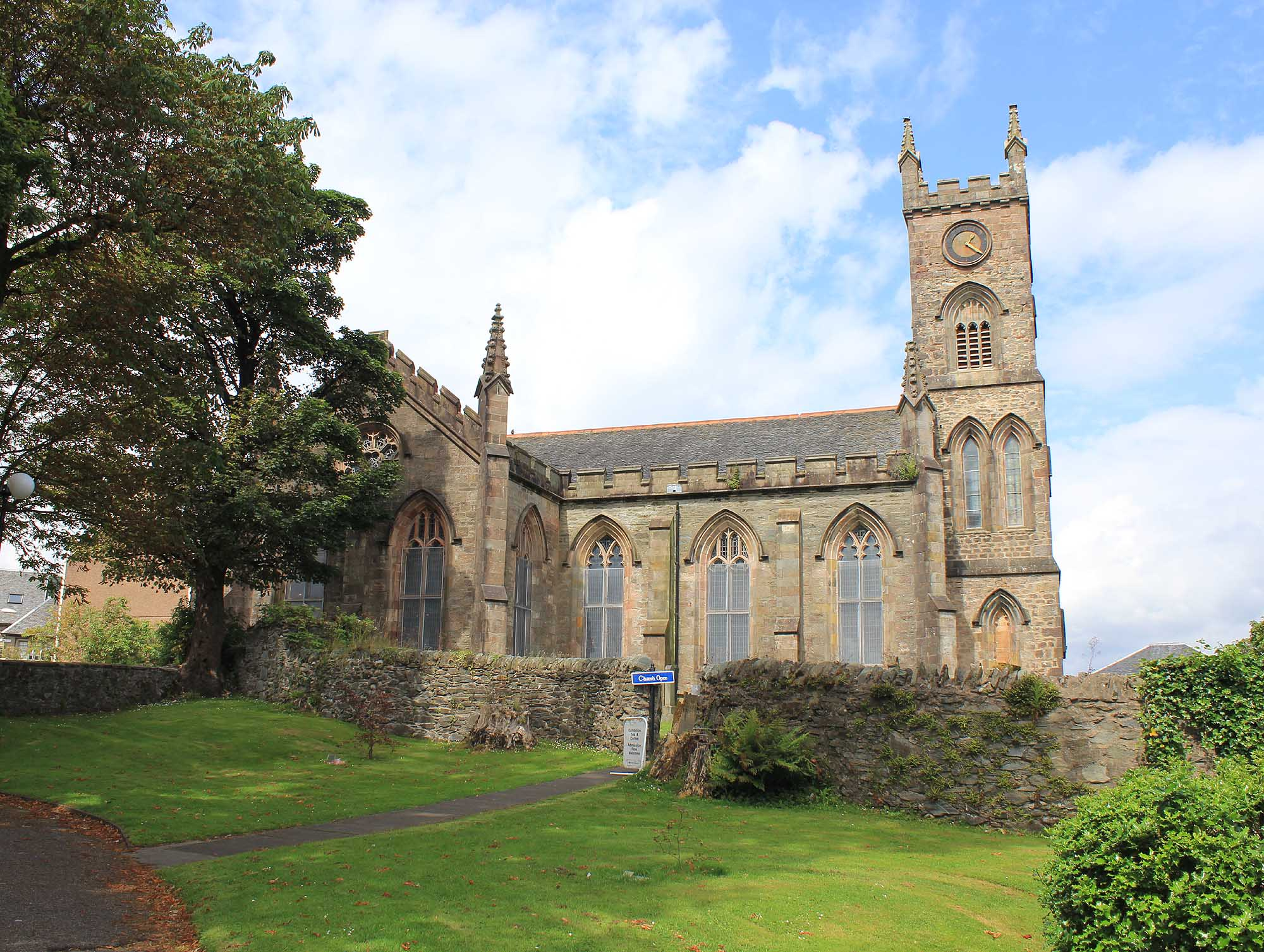
- High Kirk, 2011
- High Kirk
- 55°56′50″N 4°55′32″W
- Location: Dunoon, Argyll and Bute
- Country: Scotland
- Denomination: Church of Scotland
- Website: Cowal Kirk Website

History
- Status: Closed

Architecture
- Functional status: Closed
- Heritage designation: Category B listed building
- Designated: 20 July 1971
- Architect: James Gillespie Graham
- Architectural type: Gothic Revival
- Years built: 1816

High Kirk, also known as the Old Parish Church, is a Church of Scotland church building in Dunoon, Cowal, Argyll and Bute, Scotland. It is located on Kirk Street, just south of the town centre. Constructed in the Gothic Revival style, it is a Category B listed building. After being scheduled for closure, the final service was held at the church on 1 October 2023.

== History ==
The church was completed in 1816, to a design by architect James Gillespie Graham of Edinburgh, built near the site of an earlier, 15th-century parish church, the Bishop's Palace, which became the Cathedral Church of both the Roman Catholic and Episcopalian Bishops of Argyll. In the late 18th century, this building became dilapidated and was demolished, and the stone used to build the current incarnation. It was enlarged in 1834 by David Hamilton of Glasgow. Five years later, the church's tower, which is in three stages, was raised by eight feet. It has a clock, presented by William Campbell, on each of its four sides. In 1909, Andrew Balfour lengthened and widened the church. The 1939 chancel window is by Douglas Hamilton.

== Graveyard ==
The church's graveyard contains gravestones dating from the 13th century. Also interred here are bishops Andrew Boyd, John Cameron (d. 1623) and Hector McLean.

== See also ==
- List of listed buildings in Dunoon
