= Andrew Boyd (bishop) =

Andrew Boyd, Bishop of Argyll (1567–1636) was a Scottish Protestant bishop and Latin poet.

== Life ==
He was born in 1567 the natural son of Robert Boyd, 5th Lord Boyd and half-brother of Thomas Boyd, 6th Lord Boyd. He was educated at Glasgow University graduating MA in 1584.

Boyd was made the parson of Eaglesham in 1589, and was promoted to the see of Argyll, as their Bishop, in March 1613. He was recorded as "a good man, and did much good in his diocese, where he always resided."

He died on 22 December 1636 and is buried in Dunoon parish church. His position as bishop was filled by Rev James Fairlie.

== Family ==
He married Elizabeth (Bessie) Cunningham (Conyngham), daughter of Adam Cunningham of Auchenharvie, and widow of Thomas Boyd of Pilton. [Fasti vol VIII, p. 332]. They had six sons and one daughter:

- Thomas Boyd, minister of Eaglesham
- Andrew Boyd, Archdeacon of Argyll and minister of Lochgoilhead
- George Boyd
- James Boyd of Ruchrie
- Adam Boyd (d.1649)
- Hugh Boyd
- Elizabeth, married Rev Andrew Hamilton of Kilbarchan
