= James Fairlie (minister) =

Scottish minister (c.1588–1658)

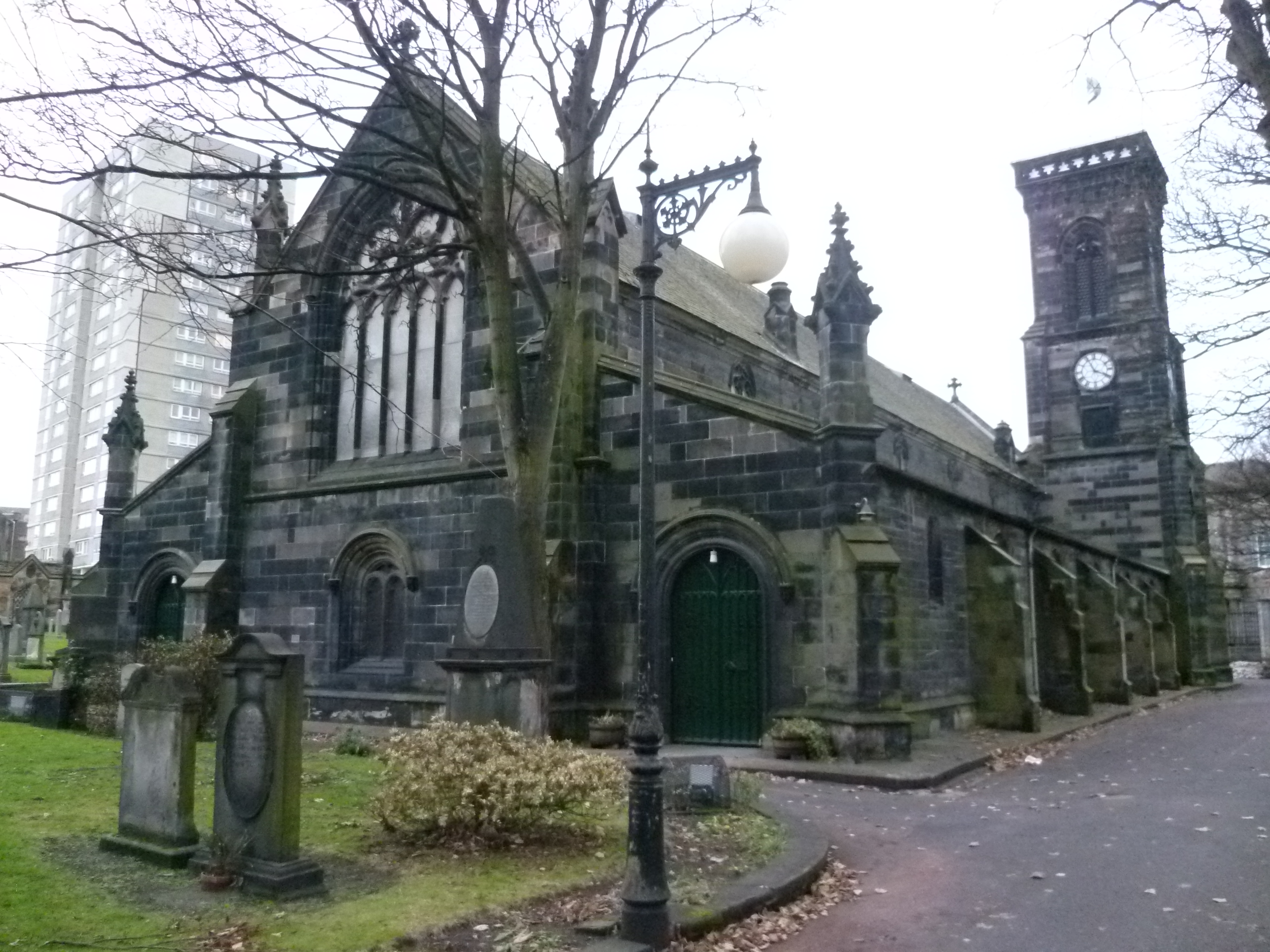
South Leith Kirk

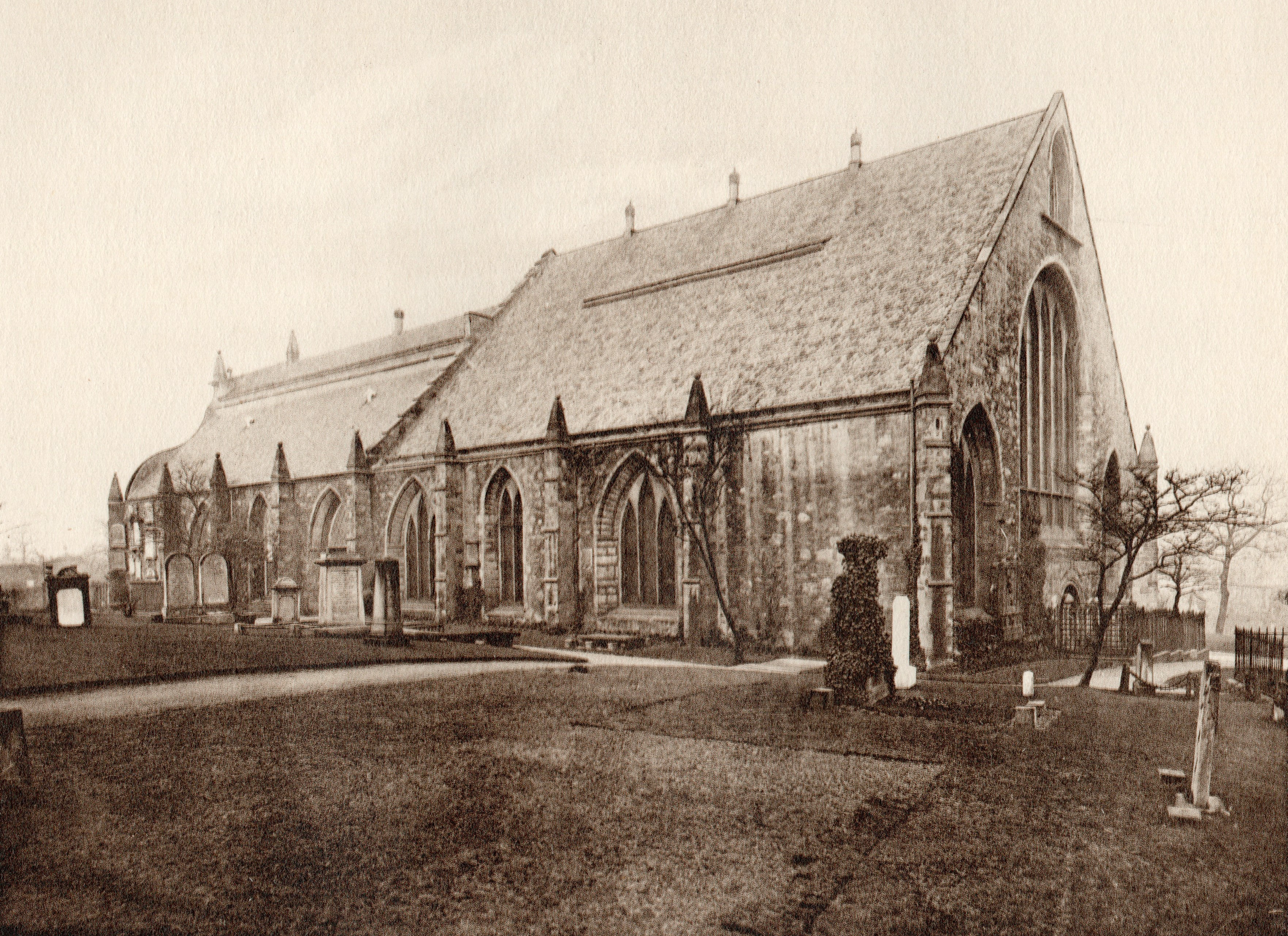
New and Old Greyfriars

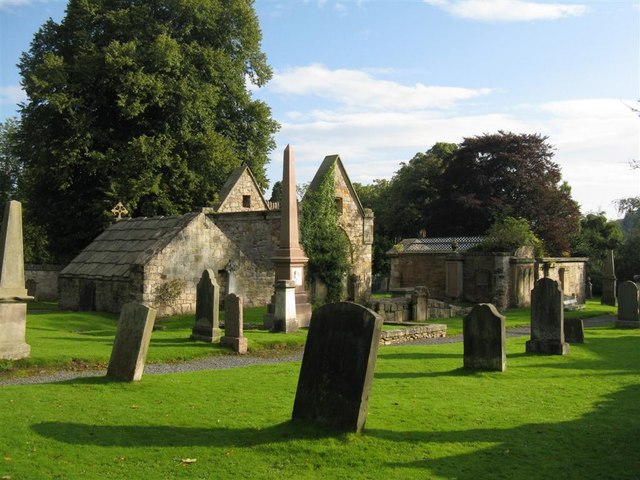
Old Lasswade Parish Church - now ruinous

James Fairlie (c.1588 – 1658) was a Scottish minister of the Church of Scotland. He was minister of Greyfriars Kirk in Edinburgh and briefly served as both Professor of Divinity at the University of Edinburgh (1629-30) and as Bishop of Argyll (1637-8).

== Life ==
Fairlie was born in Edinburgh around 1588, the son of an "honest burgess". He studied at the University of Edinburgh, gaining an MA in 1607 at the age of 19. He then served as a "regent" of the University.

In 1625, he was appointed minister of South Leith Parish Church in the harbour area of Edinburgh. In 1629 he was appointed Professor of Divinity at the University of Edinburgh. In November 1630, he replaced John Duncanson as "second charge" to Old Greyfriars alongside Rev Andrew Ramsay in "first charge".

He resigned in July 1637, having been elected Bishop of Argyll in place of Bishop Boyd but was deposed from this position by the General Assembly of the Church of Scotland in 1638. After a troubled period trying to find a new position, including failing to become minister of Largo, in March 1644 he eventually received a post as minister of Lasswade near Edinburgh under patronage of the King.

In April 1652 he was shortlisted along with Prof Alexander Colvill of St Andrews, Prof Thomas Crauford, William Colvill, William Strachan of Aberdeen and William Rait of Brechin for the position of Principal of University of Edinburgh to replace John Adamson. William Colvill was chosen but was unavailable and the post was filled for ten years by Robert Leighton until Colvill eventually took on the role.

He died in Lasswade in February 1658 and is buried in the local churchyard.

== Publications ==
- The Muse's Welcome (1618)
