= William Laird (shipbuilder) =

Scottish shipbuilder (1780–1841)

- Born: 15 February 1780; Greenock, Scotland
- Died: 27 October 1841 (aged 61)
- Known for: Birkenhead Iron Works; Hamilton Square, Birkenhead
- Children: John Laird; Macgregor Laird

William Laird (15 February 1780 – 27 October 1841) was a Scottish shipbuilder and developer who was responsible for what later became the Cammell Laird shipyard, and for starting the substantial development of its adjoining town, Birkenhead, on the Wirral in England.

== Career ==
Laird's family were from Greenock near Glasgow, and in 1810 he moved from there to Liverpool to develop the family's rope manufacturing business. By 1822 he had developed wider engineering interests, and had set up a steamship company to run between Liverpool and Glasgow.

In 1824, with business partners William Hamilton and John Forsyth, he bought land on the south bank of Wallasey Pool, an inlet of the River Mersey opposite Liverpool, adjoining the small but developing village of Birkenhead. Initially he intended to build a canal across the Wirral peninsula, but that plan soon foundered. Instead, Laird set up the Birkenhead Iron Works with another partner, Daniel Horton. In 1828, that partnership was dissolved, and Laird and his son John, a solicitor's clerk, set up a new business, William Laird & Son. This was initially a boilerworks, but in 1828 it received its first order for an iron ship, to be used on the lakes of Ireland. The business rapidly expanded, as the demand for large iron steamships developed. In 1839, his company built an armed flotilla for the East India Company.

As landowner, Laird commissioned Edinburgh architect James Gillespie Graham to design an elegant new town close to the shipyard. This became the centre of Birkenhead, focused on Hamilton Square and, after Laird's death in 1841, Birkenhead Park.

Laird's shipbuilding business moved in 1856 to a new site on the river bank at Tranmere, and in 1903 amalgamated with Charles Cammell & Company to become Cammell Laird. Laird's elder son John became MP for Birkenhead in 1861. His younger son, Macgregor Laird, was a pioneer of trade on the River Niger in Africa.
