= Buildings at Risk Register for Scotland =

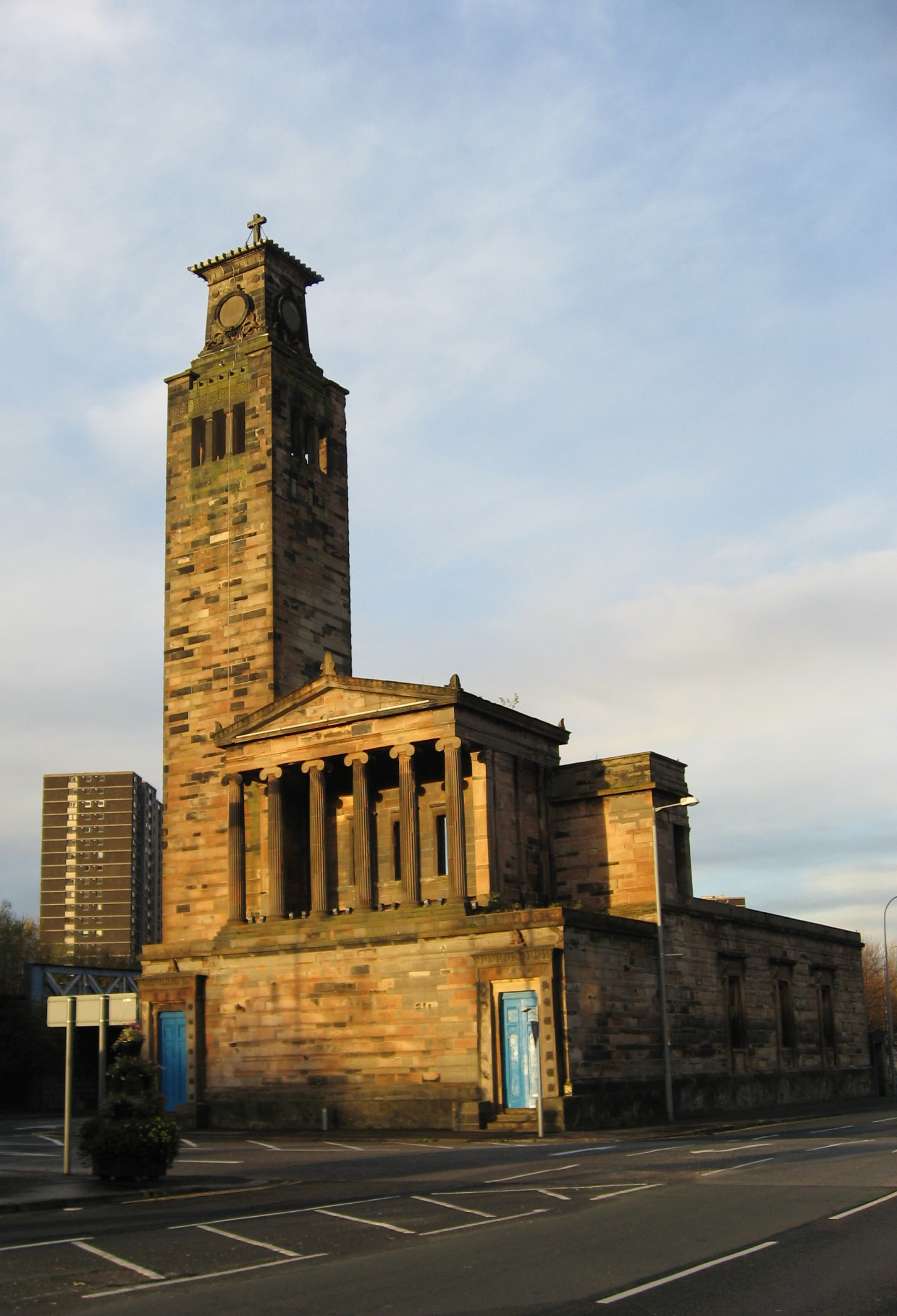
High-profile buildings on the register include Alexander 'Greek' Thomson's Caledonia Road Church in Glasgow

The Buildings at Risk Register for Scotland recorded buildings of national architectural or historic interest which were considered to be under threat. The register was established in 1990, with the purpose of raising awareness of the threats to Scotland's built heritage. It was maintained by the Scottish Civic Trust until 2011, then by RCAHMS until that body became part of Historic Environment Scotland (HES) in 2015. It ceased to be updated in 2024.

The register comprised mainly listed buildings, that is buildings of "special architectural or historic interest", but also included unlisted buildings which were within conservation areas. Other heritage assets, such as scheduled monuments, were not considered for inclusion on the register. Buildings were considered to be 'at risk' if they were under threat from demolition or neglect. The following criteria were among those used when considering buildings for inclusion:

- "vacant with no identified new use
- suffering from neglect and/or poor maintenance
- suffering from structural problems
- fire damaged
- unsecured and open to the elements
- threatened with demolition"

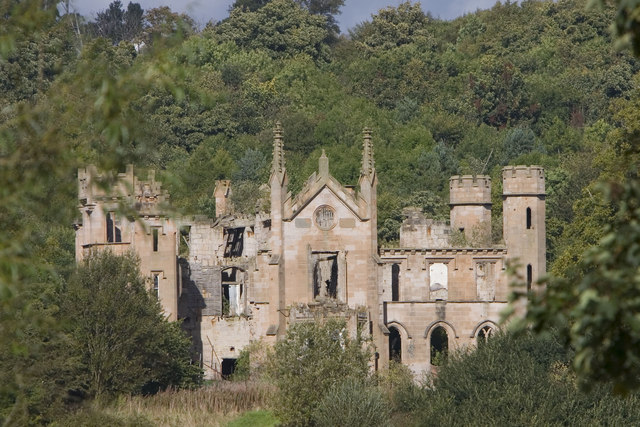
The ruined Cambusnethan Priory, North Lanarkshire, is listed at 'critical' risk

The register was continuously updated: newly identified 'at risk' buildings being added; while other are removed either due to restoration or demolition. The Buildings at Risk Register website maintained a list of 'success stories', showcasing examples of buildings which have been restored or brought back into use. In 2013, 8% of Scotland's category A listed buildings, i.e. those of national importance, were on the Buildings at Risk Register, down from 8.7% in 2009. For each building on the register descriptive information was provided, and an assessment given of the condition of the building (from 'good' to 'ruinous') and the 'category of risk' (from 'minimal' to 'critical'). The register summarised the 'development history' of each building, detailing the progress of any restoration or other proposals.

In September 2024, HES announced its decision to "pause" the Register while considering long-term options for its future. This follows a review by Harlow Consultancy, which concluded that there is little evidence that the Register has a significant impact in bringing buildings back into use.

== See also ==
- Heritage at Risk Register, the equivalent list in England
