= Birkenhead Town Hall =

Municipal building in Birkenhead, Merseyside, England

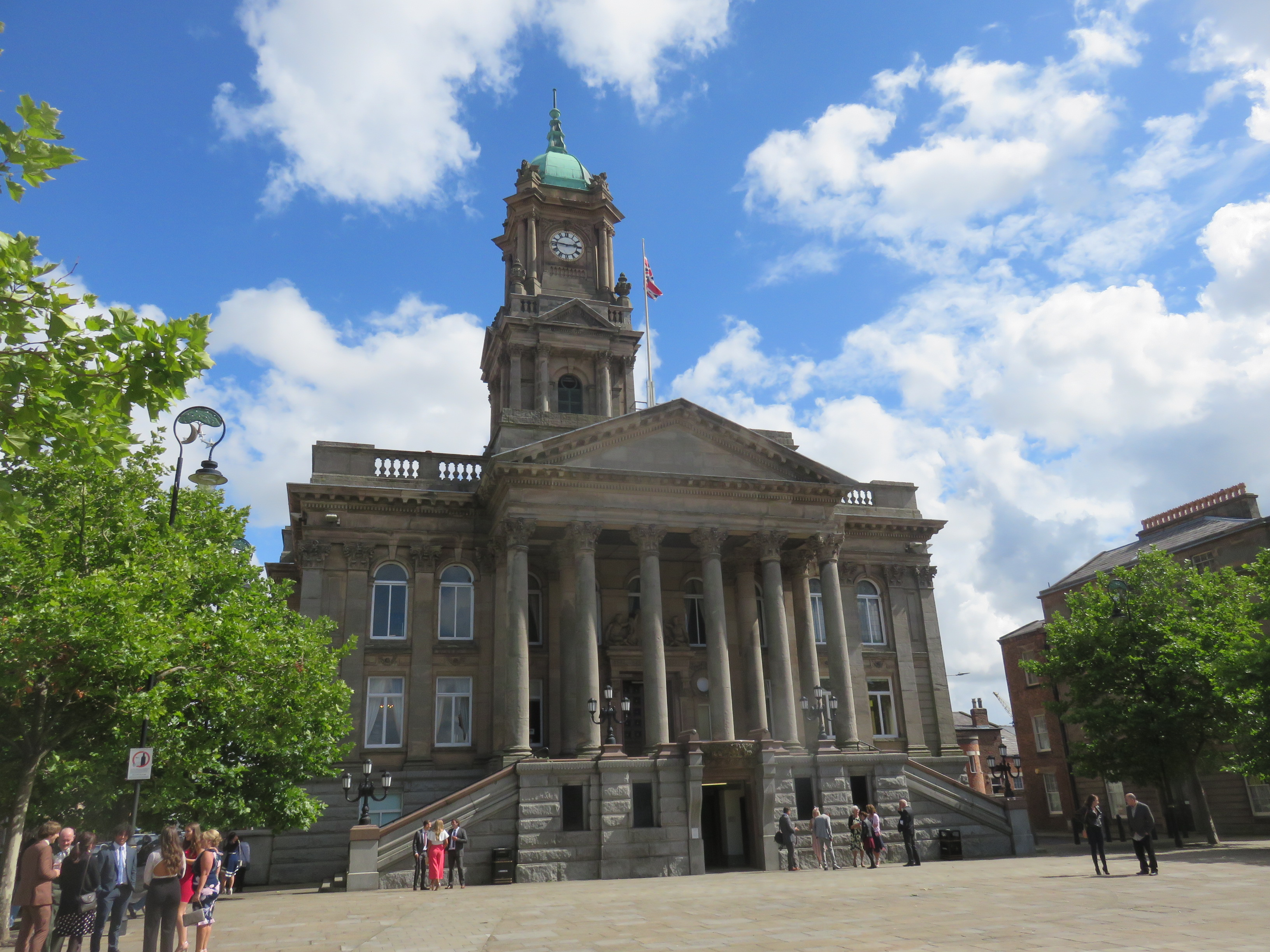

- Location within Merseyside

General information
- Architectural style: Classical
- Classification

Listed Building – Grade II*
- Designated: 29 July 1950
- Reference no.: 1201582
- Location: Hamilton Street, Birkenhead, Merseyside, CH41 5BR
- Coordinates: 53°23′36″N 3°00′52″W
- Construction started: 1883
- Completed: 1887
- Renovated: 2001

Height
- Height: 200 ft (clock tower)

Design and construction
- Architect: Christopher Obee Ellison
- Architecture firm: C O Ellison & Son

Birkenhead Town Hall is a civic building and former town hall in Birkenhead on the Wirral Peninsula in Merseyside, England. The building was the former administrative headquarters of the County Borough of Birkenhead, and more recently, council offices for the Metropolitan Borough of Wirral.

== History ==
When Hamilton Square was designed in the early 19th century, a plot of land was made available for the siting of a town hall between Hamilton Street and Chester Street. Designed by local architect Christopher Ellison, the building was constructed using Scottish granite and sandstone from the now filled-in local quarry at Storeton. It was officially opened in 1887.

The building consisted of a council chamber, offices, with a concert hall and function rooms known as the Assembly Rooms. Birkenhead's magistrates' court chambers are located in a separate building of the same design to the rear. The clock tower is 200 feet in height and displays four faces; the clock and five bells within were manufactured and fitted by Gillett & Co. (at a total cost of £900). After a fire in 1901, the upper part of the clock tower was rebuilt to a design by Henry Hartley. The rebuilding included a stained glass window by Gilbert P. Gamon representing Edward I's visit to Birkenhead Priory in 1277.

Despite the abolition of the County Borough of Birkenhead on 1 April 1974, the building continued to be used as council offices until the early 1990s, when work was undertaken to restore the external stonework and many interior decorations and features, including the former council chamber.

The Wirral Archives Service was based in the building until 2008, when it transferred to the council's Cheshire Lines Building nearby. The service collects and stores all types of historical documents relating to the Wirral area, its people, businesses and institutions. Amongst the records in the collection are documents and photographs from Birkenhead's Cammell Laird shipyard, when the original company closed in 1993.

Between 2001 and 2010, the Wirral Museum occupied a significant portion of the building. It featured both themed and permanent exhibits such as the history and development of Wirral, the Cammell Laird collection, the Wirral Silver and Mayoral collections, Della Robbia Pottery and a detailed scale model of the historic Woodside area in 1934.

The building continued to serve as the municipal registration centre for births, marriages and deaths and as a venue for local and national elections. However, in 2025, the registration service moved to Wallasey Town Hall to allow for repairs.

== Future ==
In 2009 owners Wirral Borough Council advertised the building for sale or lease, as part of its Strategic Asset Review. The council invited "expressions of interest from individuals and organisations who can demonstrate that they can secure a sustainable use for this important building." As of 2026, the building was still owned by the Council but under consideration for sale.

== See also ==
- Listed buildings in Birkenhead
