= Hamilton Square =

Town square in Wirral, England

- town square
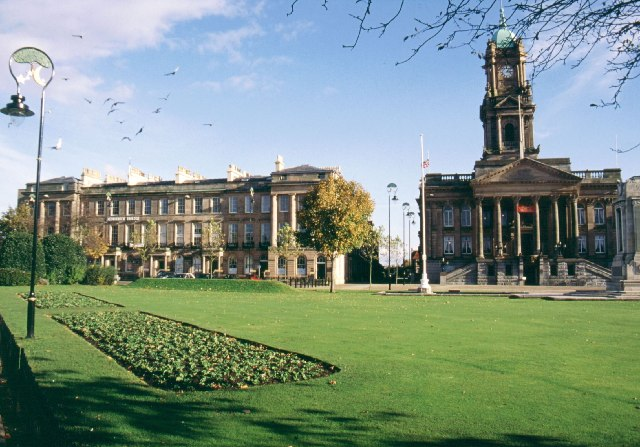
- Birkenhead Town Hall (right) in Hamilton Square.
- Design: James Gillespie Graham
- Constructed: 1825–1847
- Owner: Wirral Metropolitan Borough Council
- Location: Birkenhead, Wirral, England
- Interactive map of Hamilton Square
- Coordinates: 53°23′36″N 3°00′58″W

Hamilton Square is a town square in Birkenhead, Wirral, England. The Georgian square, which was designed by Edinburgh architect James Gillespie Graham, has the most Grade I listed buildings outside London (after Trafalgar Square). It is named after the family of the wife of Scottish shipbuilder William Laird.

Hamilton Square was the first part of a major civic scheme to develop the town of Birkenhead in the early 19th century. But owing to several factors, including a depressed economy and the influx of working-class labourers needing lodgings, the square become the only part of the grand design to be completed.

William Laird wanted to build an urban development similar in scale and style to New Town, Edinburgh. Hamilton Square would have had been at the centre of a planned borough that had wide, straight streets lined with late Georgian stone-clad terraced Townhouses, public buildings, and enclosed parks.

== History ==
In 1801 Birkenhead was still a small, undeveloped village on the banks of the River Mersey. With a recorded population of 110, it was overshadowed by the huge maritime port of Liverpool. In 1824 William Laird established a boiler works at Wallasey Pool just north of Woodside. This site developed into a shipbuilding yard. By 1831 the population of Birkenhead had risen to 2,790. As Birkenhead's economy grew, Laird had great plans for the area. In 1824, he had already bought land around Birkenhead on which he planned to build a new town.

Laird commissioned Gillespie Graham, a leading Edinburgh architect, to lay out a square and surrounding streets like Edinburgh New Town. Graham's design envisaged long and straight wide avenues lined with elegant town houses. Hamilton Square would be located where it would get the maximum benefit from the area's topography. This would ensure it would be visible from the Liverpool waterfront emphasising Birkenhead's civic pride. Work started on the eastern side of the new town around Hamilton Square in 1825. But owing to the economic depression throughout the mid-19th century, it was the only part of Graham's plan to be fully completed. The square's name is taken from the maiden name of Mary MacGregor (née Hamilton), the mother of Laird's wife, Agnes Laird (née MacGregor); Mary MacGregor's brother, William Hamilton, was also one of Laird's business partners.

As the square would be the focal point of civic authority in Birkenhead, a lot was purposely left vacant on the east side of the square for a town hall. On 10 July 1835 part of the unused site, between Hamilton Street and Chester Street, was used to establish Birkenhead's first market. An increase in the town's population led to the opening of a much larger market nearby in 1845. In 1883, almost sixty years after work started, construction on the town hall began. Birkenhead Town Hall, which opened in 1887, was designed by local architect Charles Ellison. It is built of Scottish granite and sandstone from the local quarry at Storeton. The upper part of the clock tower was rebuilt in 1901 after suffering fire damage. Wirral Borough Council relocated to the Town Hall in 2023 from Wallasey Town Hall.

== Features ==
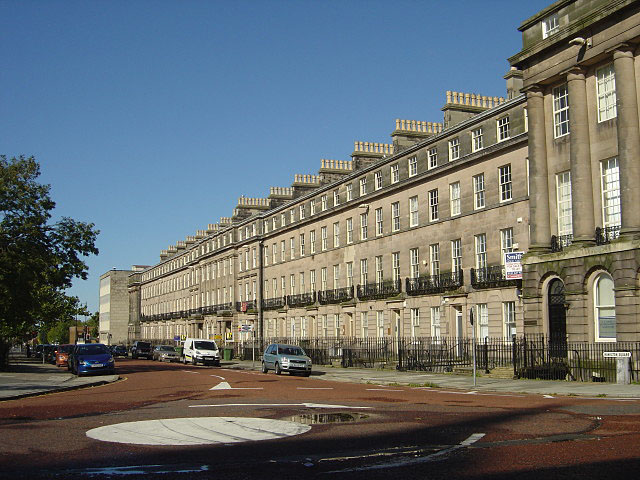
Georgian terracing along the north side of Hamilton Square

No two sides of the square's Georgian terracing are identical. The private gardens within the square were acquired by the local council in 1903, and opened to the public. The square include the town's cenotaph in front of the town hall, a large Queen Victoria Monument and a statue of John Laird (son of William Laird); 63 Hamilton Square, the former home of John Laird, Birkenhead's first Member of Parliament, is now a Grade I listed building, along with 1–18, 35–50 and 58–62 in Hamilton Square. Part of the square – which was built between 1825 and 1847 – was pedestrianised as part of £80m work carried out in the Hamilton Quarter area between 1995 and 2002. A plan by Wirral Metropolitan Borough Council to reopen the square to traffic, was scrapped in January 2016.

Hamilton Square railway station opened in 1886.

== See also ==
- Listed buildings in Birkenhead
