= List of works by Charles Reed =

Charles Reed (1814–59), later known as Charles Verelst, was an English architect who practised in Birkenhead, which was then in Cheshire and later in Merseyside. Most of his works are in the locality of his office, but he also designed buildings in North Wales, Lancashire and Cumbria. Reed's listed buildings are mainly large houses, but he also designed churches and a market hall.

Grade	Criteria
II*	Particularly important buildings of more than special interest.
II	Buildings of national importance and special interest.
"—" denotes a work that is not graded.

== Confirmed works ==
Name and location	Photograph	Date	Notes	Grade
13 Charlesville, Claughton, Merseyside; 53.38554°N 3.04304°W	—	c. 1840–48	A stuccoed house with a Welsh slate roof. It has two storeys and a three-bay front, the pedimented central bay projecting slightly forward, and containing a lean-to porch. This is flanked by three-light windows under a segmental arch. The windows are casements, the central one in the upper floor having an entablature.	II
Shaw Hill, Whittle-le-Woods, Lancashire; 53.68268°N 2.64216°W		Early 1840s	A country house incorporating parts of an earlier house, later a golf club. It is in stone with a hipped slate roof, and has a square plan, three storeys, and five bays on each side. The entrance front is on the north side and has a porch with a Roman Doric colonnade. On the west front is a full height bow window. All the windows are sashes.	II
31 Grosvenor Road, Claughton, Merseyside; 53.38831°N 3.04412°W	—	c. 1844–48	A stuccoed house with a Welsh slate roof. It has two storeys and a symmetrical three-bay front. In the centre is a portico porch flanked by bay windows containing sashes. The windows in the upper floor are casements, the central one with an entablature on consoles.	II
24 and 26 Devonshire Road, Claughton, Merseyside; 53.38731°N 3.04882°W	—	c. 1845	A pair of stuccoed brick houses with a Welsh slate roof. They are symmetrical, in two storeys, and each house has three bays. The outer bays project forward and are gabled with a single-storey canted bay window. The central bays of each house contain a pedimented porch, and in the inner bays are French windows. The other windows are casements, those in the upper floor being round-headed.	II
Church of St John the Evangelist, Birkenhead, Merseyside	—	1845–47	The church was consecrated on 28 April 1859. It closed in 1974.	—
28 and 30 Devonshire Road, Claughton, Merseyside; 53.38771°N 3.04346°W	—	c. 1845–50	A pair of stuccoed brick houses with a Welsh slate roof. They are symmetrical, in two storeys, and each house has two bays. The outer bays project forward and have a single-storey canted bay window. The other windows have two lights, and the left hand house has a first floor balcony. The entrances are on the sides, and have porches with hipped roofs.	II
Market Hall, Lytham, Lancashire; 53.73731°N 2.96491°W		1847–48	The market hall, later used for other purposes, is in red brick with sandstone dressings, and hipped slate roofs. The building has a rectangular plan, it is in s single storey, and has a front of nine bays. A clock tower was added later.	II
St Peter's Church, Chorley, Lancashire; 53.66064°N 2.62357°W		1848–52	A sandstone church in Early English style, with a gritstone plinth and dressings, and a slate roof with ridge tiles. It consists of a nave with aisles, transepts, a chancel, and a polygonal northwest turret. Most of the windows are lancets.	II
Stanacres, Raby, Merseyside; 53.31805°N 3.03397°W	—	1849–51	A large country house in Gothic style, built in sandstone with slate roofs. It has 2 1/2 storeys and an entrance front of three gabled bays. In the centre bays is a protruding porch with pilasters and a gablet with a finial. Most of the windows are sashes, some are mullioned and transomed, and there are dormers in the roof.	II
Cowley House, St Helens, Merseyside; 53.46278°N 2.74369°W	—	1850	A large house in Italianate style, later converted into offices. It is stuccoed with hipped slate roofs, is in two storeys, and has a three-bay front, all the faces being symmetrical. Features include a tower with a low-pitched roof, and a central lantern above the staircase.	II
32 and 34 Devonshire Road, Claughton, Merseyside; 53.38773°N 3.04396°W	—	c. 1850	A pair of stone houses with hipped Welsh slate roofs. They are symmetrical, in two storeys, and each house has two bays. The outer bays contain a bow window, and the windows are mullioned and transomed. The entrances are on the sides.	II
36 Devonshire Road, Claughton, Merseyside; 53.38780°N 3.04443°W	—	c. 1850	A brick house with rendered stone dressings and a hipped Welsh slate roof. It has two storeys and an attic, and a two-bay front. In the left bay is a canted bay window with a parapet and a pedimented window above. To the right is a three-light window, with a window in an architrave above. The porch is on the side.	II
38 and 40 Devonshire Road, Claughton, Merseyside; 53.38784°N 3.04497°W	—	1853	A pair of brick houses with stone dressings and a Welsh slate roof, in Italianate style. They have two storeys, and each house has a three-bay front. The entrances are through porches on the sides, and there are recessed wings. The outer bays project forward and contain a bay window with a parapet. The windows are sashes.	II
Runcorn Town Hall, Runcorn, Cheshire; 53.33361°N 2.72371°W		1853–56	Originally a country house called Halton Grange, it is rendered with a slate roof in Italianate style. The building is in two storeys, and has a three-bay front with a four-storey tower in the style of that at Osbourne House. The entrance front has a Tuscan portico with an open balustrade above. The ground floor windows are double casements and those above are sashes.	II
Plas Rhianfa, Llandegfan, Anglesey		1849	Large sea-side villa, of ornate French gothic (inspired by the chateaux of the Loire). Dressed Penmon limestone rubble facing, with freestone dressings and (with the exception of the turrets), fish scale slate roofs. Built to enjoy the prospect over the Menai Strait, on a dramatically sloping site.	II*
Underscar Manor, Underskiddaw, Cumbria; 54.62051°N 3.13179°W		1856–63	A sandstone country house with Westmorland slate roofs, later a hotel, in Italianate style. It has an irregular linear plan, and a symmetrical entrance front of two storeys and three bays. There are two towers in the style of that at Osbourne House, one of which is in the centre of the entrance front. At the southeast corner is a large 19th-century conservatory.	II
St Laurence's Church, Chorley, Lancashire; 53.65473°N 2.63258°W		1859–60	A medieval church largely rebuilt by Reed, including the aisles, arcades and vestries. These parts are in Decorated style, including gargoyles. Further alterations were made in 1913–14 in Perpendicular style. The church is built in stone with slate roofs.	II*

== Attributed works ==
Name and location	Photograph	Date	Notes	Grade
Aston Lodge, Claughton, Merseyside; 53.38725°N 3.04400°W	—	c. 1840	A stuccoed house with a Welsh slate roof in Tudor Gothic style. It has two storeys, and a symmetrical three-bay front, each bay being gabled. The central bay projects forward and has octagonal angle turrets and a doorway. In the left bay is a canted bay window. The windows are mullioned. On the right side is a late 19th-century polygonal conservatory.	II
Kenyon Terrace, 1–15 Devonshire Road, Claughton, Merseyside; 53.38744°N 3.03952°W	—	c. 1840	A terrace of eight stone houses with a Welsh slate roof in Italianate style. They are symmetrical and in three storeys, with the outer and central sections protruding forward. The ground floor is rusticated, some houses have Ionic porches, others have pedimented doorcases with fanlights. The windows are sashes.	II
Kenyon Terrace, 17–31 Devonshire Road, Claughton, Merseyside; 53.38732°N 3.04029°W	—	c. 1844–48	A terrace of eight stone houses with a Welsh slate roof in Italianate style. They are symmetrical and in three storeys, with the outer and central sections protruding forward. The ground floor is rusticated, some houses have Ionic porches, others have pedimented doorcases with fanlights. The windows are sashes.	II
Kenyon Terrace, 33–47 Devonshire Road, Claughton, Merseyside; 53.38719°N 3.04112°W	—	c. 1844–48	A terrace of eight stone houses with a Welsh slate roof in Italianate style. They are symmetrical and in three storeys, with the outer and central sections protruding forward. The ground floor is rusticated, some houses have Ionic porches, others have pedimented doorcases with fanlights. The windows are sashes.	II
4 Caroline Place, Claughton, Merseyside; 53.38688°N 3.04394°W	—	c. 1845	A brick house with a Welsh slate roof, probably by Charles Reed. It has two storeys and a symmetrical three-bay front. The central entrance has a gabled pedimented porch and a segmental archway. The windows are sashes, those in the upper floor having small balconies.	II
Springfield Lodge, Claughton, Merseyside; 53.38702°N 3.04399°W	—	c. 1845	A stuccoed house with a Welsh slate roof. It has two storeys and a three-bay front. In the centre is a portico porch flanked by mullioned and transomed casements with entablatures on consoles. The upper floor windows are similar. On the right side is a canted bay window.	II
40 and 42 Devonshire Place, Claughton, Merseyside; 53.38731°N 3.04882°W	—	c. 1850	A pair of houses in brick with stone dressings and a Welsh slate roof. They are symmetrical with two storeys, and each house has a two-bay front. The outer bays contain two-storey canted bay windows with an entablature containing a cartouche. The gabled inner bays are flanked by pilasters, with a three-light window in the ground floor and a sash window above. The entrances are on the sides.	II
20 and 22 Rosemount, Oxton, Merseyside; 53.37983°N 3.04591°W	—	c. 1850–58	A pair of stuccoed house with a hipped Welsh slate roof. They are in two storeys and each house has a two-bay front, with the entrances on the sides. The ground floor windows are mullioned with sashes and voussoirs. In the upper floor they are mullioned and transomed with segmental pediments.	II
