= Trinity with Palm Grove Church, Claughton =

Coordinates: 53.3862°N 3.0501°W

- Trinity With Palm Grove United Reformed and Methodist Church
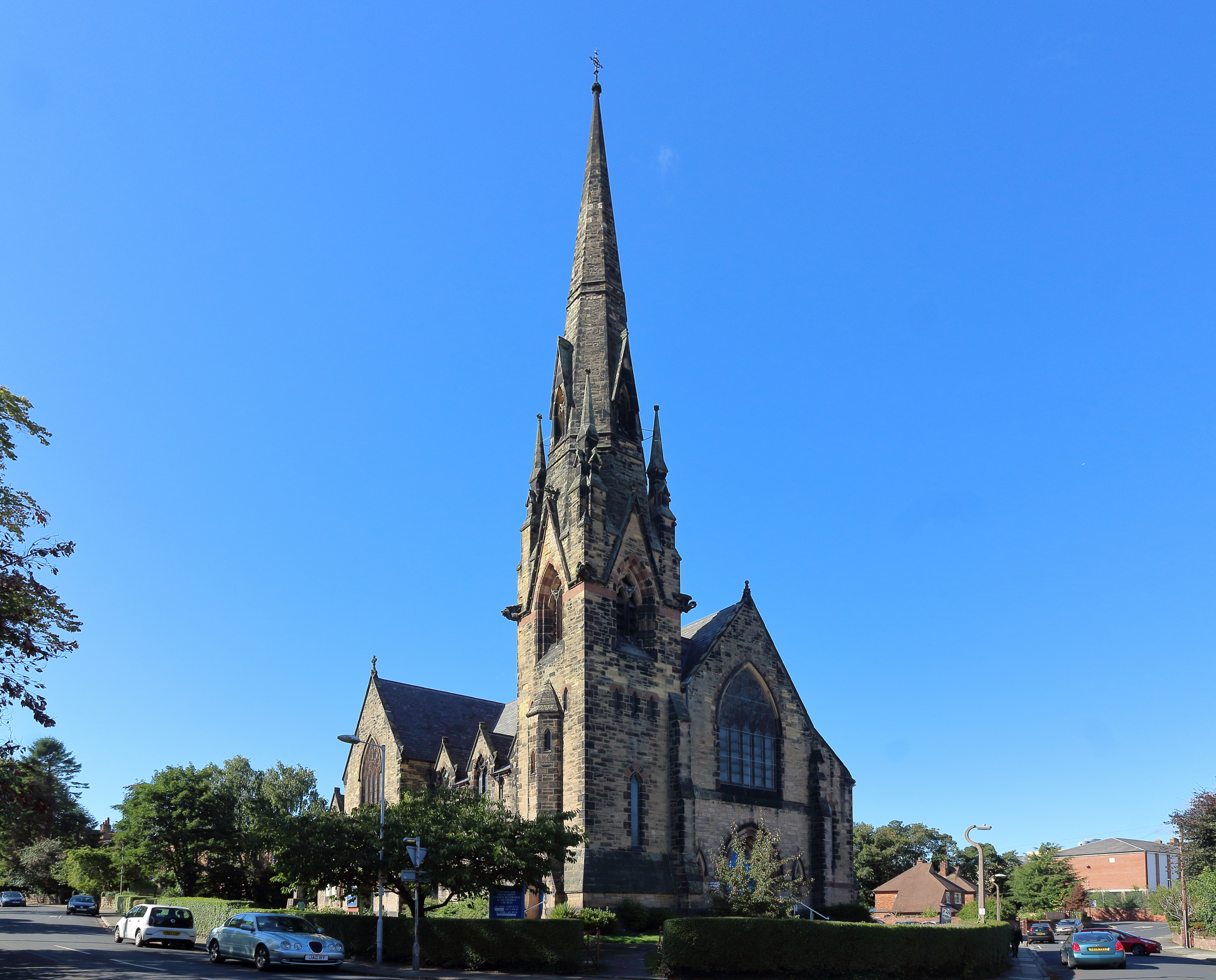
- The church from the northeast

- Location in Merseyside
- OS grid reference: SJ 303 882
- Location: Alton Road, Claughton, Birkenhead, Wirral, Merseyside
- Country: England
- Denomination: United Reformed Church and Methodist
- Website: Trinity with Palm Grove Church

Architecture
- Functional status: Active
- Heritage designation: Grade II
- Designated: 10 August 1992
- Architect(s): W. and J. Hay
- Architectural type: Church
- Style: Gothic Revival
- Groundbreaking: 1865
- Completed: 1866

Specifications
- Materials: Stone, slate roof

Trinity with Palm Grove Church is in Alton Road, Claughton, Birkenhead, Wirral, Merseyside, England. It is a combined United Reformed and Methodist Church. The church is recorded in the National Heritage List for England as a designated Grade II listed building.

== History ==
Originally known as Trinity Church, it was built between 1865 and 1866, and was designed by W. and J. Hay. Initially it was a Presbyterian church. In 1977 Trinity Presbyterian Church was united with Palm Grove Methodist Church. (Note: In 1972 the United Reformed Church was formed by a union of the Presbyterian Church of England and most of the churches in the Congregational church in England and Wales. In some areas the United Reformed Church and Methodist churches work together in a United Area.)

== Architecture ==
Trinity Church is constructed in rubble stone with dressings in red and yellow ashlar. It has slated roofs. The plan consists of a nave with a south porch, north and south aisles, north and south transepts, a hall with a north porch at the east end, and a northwest tower with a spire. At the west end is a doorway with a trefoil head flanked by lancet windows. Over this is a five-light window with Decorated tracery. The porch is canted, and has a doorway with lancet windows above it. Along the sides of the aisles each gabled bay contains three lancets and a two-light Decorated window above. On the north and south sides of the transepts are two groups of three lancets, with a four-light Decorated window above. The hall at the east end has an apse and a large gabled north porch. On the north side of the tower is a doorway leading to a projecting stair turret. In the top stage of the tower are paired bell openings under gables, and on the corners are pinnacles. There are lucarnes on the spire.

Inside the church is a gallery that curves round three sides. This is carried on square cast iron columns, and contains raked seating. The columns continue up to the roof, and have foliate capitals. At the east end of the church is a central octagonal pulpit, reading desks and a lectern, all of which are flanked by choir stalls.

== See also ==
- Listed buildings in Claughton, Merseyside

== Notes and references ==
Notes

Citations
