= Listed buildings in Underskiddaw =

Underskiddaw is a civil parish in the Cumberland district, Cumbria, England. It contains 21 listed buildings that are recorded in the National Heritage List for England. Of these, one is listed at Grade II*, the middle of the three grades, and the others are at Grade II, the lowest grade. The parish includes the settlements of Ormathwaite, Applethwaite, and Millbeck, and is otherwise rural. Almost all the listed buildings are, or originated as, houses of various types, farmhouses or farm buildings. Two of the buildings originated as mills, and one former country house has been converted into a hotel. The other listed building is a village hall.

== Key ==
Grade	Criteria
II*	Particularly important buildings of more than special interest
II	Buildings of national importance and special interest

== Buildings ==
Name and location	Photograph	Date	Notes	Grade
Millbeck Hall and barn 54.62441°N 3.15380°W	—	1592	A farmhouse and barn, roughcast with green slate roofs. The house has two storeys and five bays, a single-bay wing at the rear, and a two-bay barn to the right, forming an L-shaped plan. Most of the windows are mullioned, there are fire windows, and two 20th-century casement windows. At the rear is a Tudor-style doorway with an inscribed and dated shaped lintel. External steps lead up to a loft doorway.	II*
Scaur House; 54.62081°N 3.14025°W	—	17th century (probable)	A roughcast house with a green slate roof, in two storeys and two bays, with a single-bay right extension forming an L-shaped plan. On the front is a lean-to porch. The windows are a mix of casements and sash, one of the latter being horizontally siding.	II
Yew Tree Cottage; 54.62062°N 3.13989°W	—	Mid 17th century	Formerly a cottage and attached barn, it was altered in 1939 and is now one house. It is rendered with a green slate roof, and has one storey and four bays. There are two doorways, one with a gabled porch, and casement windows in plain reveals. Inside the house is a pair of full crucks.	II
Applethwaite Farmhouse; 54.62047°N 3.14164°W	—	Mid or late 17th century	A roughcast farmhouse with a green slate roof, it is in two storeys and three bays, and has a two-bay extension at the rear. The plank door has its original studs and hinges, and stands in an open slate porch. The windows are horizontally sliding sashes in plain reveals.	II
Canons Cottage; 54.62465°N 3.15348°W		Early 18th century	Originally a blacksmith's shop, later converted into other uses, it is in slate rubble, and has a green slate roof. There are 1 1/2 storeys and two bays. On the front is a central doorway flanked by casement windows, all in plain reveals.	II
Old Windebrowe and barn 54.60627°N 3.12127°W	—	Early 18th century (probable)	This was originally a farmhouse and a barn, later altered and used for other purposes. It is in mixed rubble, mainly slate and some brick, with small galleting pieces, slate quoins, and a green slate roof. The house has two storeys, three bays, two doorways, and sash windows. The lower barn to the right has eleven bays and a byre beneath. There are two cart entrances that are approached by slab bridges.	II
Orchard Cottage; 54.62484°N 3.15341°W	—	Early 18th century (probable)	The house is in slate rubble on large plinth stones, and has a green slate roof. There are two storeys and two bays, with a lower single-bay extension to the left. There is a slate porch, and the windows are casements with plain reveals.	II
Ormathwaite Hall; 54.61775°N 3.13512°W	—	Early 18th century	A roughcast house on a chamfered plinth, it has a green slate roof with coped gables. There are two storeys and five bays, with a two-bay extension to the left. The doorway has pilasters and a pediment in which there are painted figures and foliage. The windows are sashes in stone surrounds. On the left is a canted bay window.	II
Low Grove Farmhouse; 54.62284°N 3.15030°W	—	Mid 18th century	A roughcast farmhouse with a green slate roof, it has two storeys and six bays. The doorway has an architrave, and the sash windows are in segmental-headed plain reveals.	II
Sunnyside; 54.62033°N 3.14114°W	—	Mid 18th century (probable)	Originally two cottages, later combined into one house, the building is in slate rubble with a green slate roof. There are two storeys and two bays. In the centre are two doorways sharing a gabled porch that contains side seats. The windows are sashes with plain reveals.	II
Ormathwaite Hall Farmhouse and barns 54.61736°N 3.13458°W	—	1769	The farmhouse and barns are roughcast with green slate roofs. The house has two storeys, five bays, a gabled porch, and sash windows. The barns flank the house at right angles, forming a U-shaped plan. They contain doorways and ventilation slits, and the barn on the left has a hexagonal sundial finial.	II
Workshop and flat, Ormathwaite Hall; 54.61761°N 3.13476°W	—	Late 18th century	This originated as a laboratory, was later used as a school house and coach house, and subsequently converted into a workshop and a flat. It is roughcast with hipped slate roof. There are two storeys and four bays, with flanking single-storey, two-bay wings. The doorway has an architrave and a pediment. The windows are casements, and there is an octagonal window above the doorway.	II
Millbeck Towers; 54.62504°N 3.15309°W	—	Late 18th century	Originally a woollen carding mill, it was altered in 1903 and is now a private house. It is partly rendered and partly roughcast, and has a Welsh slate roof. There are three storeys and three bays, and flanking circular angle towers with Lombard friezes and conical roofs. The windows are 20th-century casements, some with pediments.	II
South Lodge, Mirehouse; 54.64253°N 3.18747°W	—	Late 18th century	The lodge was extended in the mid 19th century. The original part is roughcast, the extension is in slate rubble, and the roof is in green slate. There is one storey, two bays, and a single-bay extension, resulting in a T-shaped plan. The windows are horizontally sliding sashes, and in the gable ends there are Tudor-style windows with hood moulds. In the extension is a doorway with a gabled porch, and a canted bay window to the right.	II
Millbeck Towers Cottages and storeroom 54.62586°N 3.15252°W	—	1805	This originated as a water-powered fulling mill, and was later converted into two houses and a storeroom. The building is roughcast with a green slate roof. The storeroom has two storeys and four bays, with a two-bay recessed extension. It has doorways, steps up to a loft door, and casement windows. The houses have three storeys and two bays each. In the lower two floors the windows are sashes, and in the top floor they are original mill windows.	II
Scaur Cottage; 54.62074°N 3.14040°W	—	1822	Originally two cottages, later combined into one house, it is in slate rubble with a green slate roof. The house has two storeys, two bays, a doorway, a blocked doorway, and sash windows in plain reveals.	II
Little Crosthwaite Cottages; 54.63963°N 3.18911°W	—	Early 19th century	Originally four, later three, cottages in slate rubble, roughcast at the front and with a green slate roof. There are two storeys, and each cottage has two bays, a gable, and a round-arched doorway. In the ground floor the windows are casements, and in the upper floor and at the rear they are horizontally sliding sashes.	II
Millbeck Place; 54.62472°N 3.15223°W	—	Early 19th century	A roughcast house with quoins and a green slate roof with coped gables. There are two storeys and two bays. The door has a radial fanlight and a pilastered doorcase with a pediment. It is flanked by two-storey canted bay windows containing sash windows with stone surrounds.	II
Windebrowe; 54.60600°N 3.12210°W	—	c. 1833	A country house by George Basevi in Palladian style, incorporating an earlier house. It is stuccoed, with quoins, string courses, an eaves cornice, and a hipped green slate roof. There are two storeys and three bays, the central bay projecting forward under a pediment. On the front is a central Venetian doorway, and the windows are sashes.	II
Underscar Manor Hotel; 54.62051°N 3.13179°W		1856–63	A country house by Charles Verelst in sandstone with Westmorland slate roofs, later a hotel, in Italianate style. The building has an irregular linear plan, and a symmetrical entrance front of two storeys and three bays. There are two towers in the style of that at Osbourne House, one of which is in the centre of the entrance front. At the southeast corner is a large 19th-century conservatory.	II
Village Hall; 54.62488°N 3.15368°W		1896	The hall is in slate rubble with quoins and dressings in red sandstone and a roof of green slate. There is one storey and three bays. On the front are two doorways and casement windows, all with segmental pediments.	II
