= Harry Verelst =

Harry Verelst may refer to:

- Harry Verelst (colonial governor) (1734–1785), colonial administrator and the governor of Bengal, 1767–1769
- Harry Verelst (cricketer) (1846–1918), English amateur cricketer
