= St Laurence's Church, Chorley =

Coordinates: 53.6547°N 2.6325°W

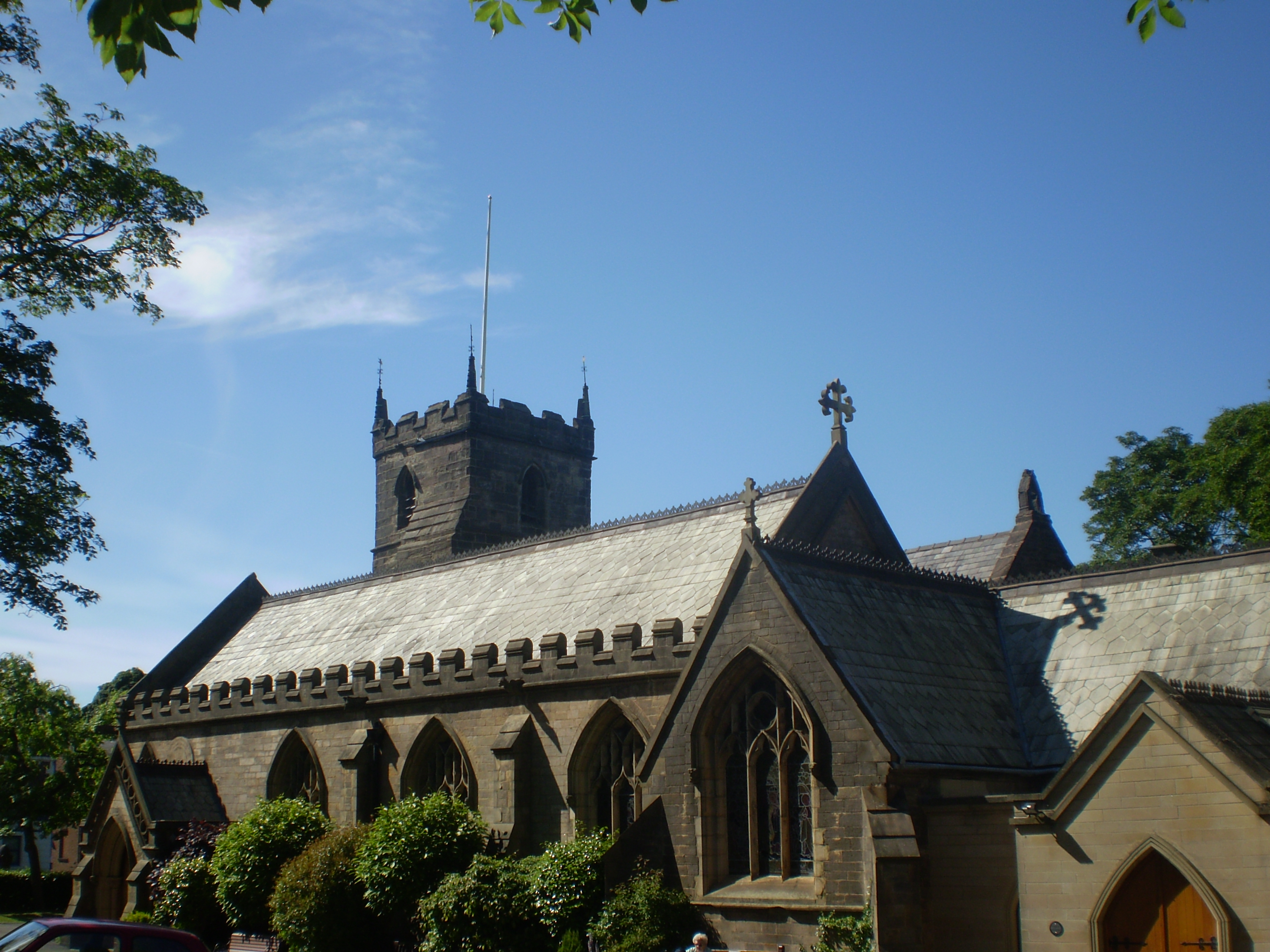
- St Laurence's Church, Chorley, from the southeast

- Location in the Borough of Chorley
- OS grid reference: SD 583 178
- Location: Union Street, Chorley, Lancashire
- Country: England
- Denomination: Anglican
- Website: St Laurence, Chorley

History
- Status: Parish church

Architecture
- Functional status: Active
- Heritage designation: Grade II*
- Designated: 21 December 1966
- Architectural type: Church
- Style: Gothic, Gothic Revival

Specifications
- Materials: Stone, slate roofs

Administration
- Province: York
- Diocese: Blackburn
- Archdeaconry: Blackburn
- Deanery: Chorley
- Parish: St Laurence, Chorley

Clergy
- Rector: Fr Neil Kelley

St Laurence's Church is in Union Street, Chorley, Lancashire, England. It is an active Anglican parish church in the deanery of Chorley, the archdeaconry of Blackburn, and the diocese of Blackburn. The church is recorded in the National Heritage List for England as a designated Grade II* listed building.

== History ==
A church was almost certainly present on the site in the Anglo-Saxon era as the daughter church of Croston. The first documentary record is dated 1362 and refers to a priest for the church. A letter dated 1442 refers to a reliquary owned by the church which is said to contain bones of Saint Laurence. The tower in the present church dates from the 15th century. St Laurence's became a parish church in its own right in 1793, and subsequently the mother church of the other churches in the town. A major rebuilding of the church took place in 1859–61, when among other changes, the galleries were removed, and aisles were added. There is disagreement about the architect responsible for this. Hartwell and Pevsner in the Buildings of England series say it was Charles Verelst (formerly Reed) of Liverpool, but Price attributes the work to the Lancaster architect E. G. Paley. Further alterations took place in 1913–14. The interior of the church was reordered towards the end of the 20th century.

== Architecture ==
=== Exterior ===
The church is constructed in stone with slate roofs. The architectural style of the body of the church is Perpendicular. The plan of the church consists of a four-bay nave with a south porch, north and south aisles under separate roofs, a chancel with a south transept and a separate south chapel, and a west tower. The tower is in three stages, with diagonal buttresses, and a battlemented parapet with gargoyles. Each of the buttresses contains a carving of a shield with three boars' heads in the lower stage,^{[A]} and a niche in the upper stage. Between the buttresses is a dripmould with carved bosses. On the west side of the tower is a doorway, with a four-light window above it. The top stage contains a louvred two-light bell opening on each side. On the south side of the tower is a stair turret. At the east end of the nave is a Sanctus bellcote. Both aisles are buttressed with gargoyles and battlemented parapets. The north aisle has a five-light window, a doorway, and one canted bay. The south aisle has a four-light west window and a porch. Above the porch is a large round sundial.

=== Interior ===
Inside the church the arcades are carried on octagonal piers. In the chancel is a glazed recess containing animal bones. There are two fonts, one in the chancel, possibly dating from the medieval period, and the other in the south aisle containing material from different periods. At the west end of the south aisle are two family pews. The Standish pew dates from the early 17th century; Hartwell and Pevsner describe it as "the best example of its type in North Lancashire". The Parker pew dates from the later part of the 17th century. The stained glass includes a west window dating from the 1860s by Hardman, and windows dated 1963 and 1965 by Harry Stammers. In the church are memorials dating from the 17th, 18th centuries and later, some to members of the Standish family, and an alabaster First World War memorial. The organ was built in 1860 by Forster and Andrews, and rebuilt in 1953 by Rushworth and Dreaper. Revisions were made to it in 1990 by Sixsmith. There is a ring of eight bells cast by John Taylor Bellfounders in 1996.

== See also ==
- Grade II* listed buildings in Lancashire
- Listed buildings in Chorley
- List of ecclesiastical works by E. G. Paley
- List of works by Charles Reed

== Notes ==
^{A} The carvings are possibly the arms of William Booth, Bishop of Lichfield.
