= Underscar Manor =

Listed building in Underskiddaw, Cumbria

- Underscar House
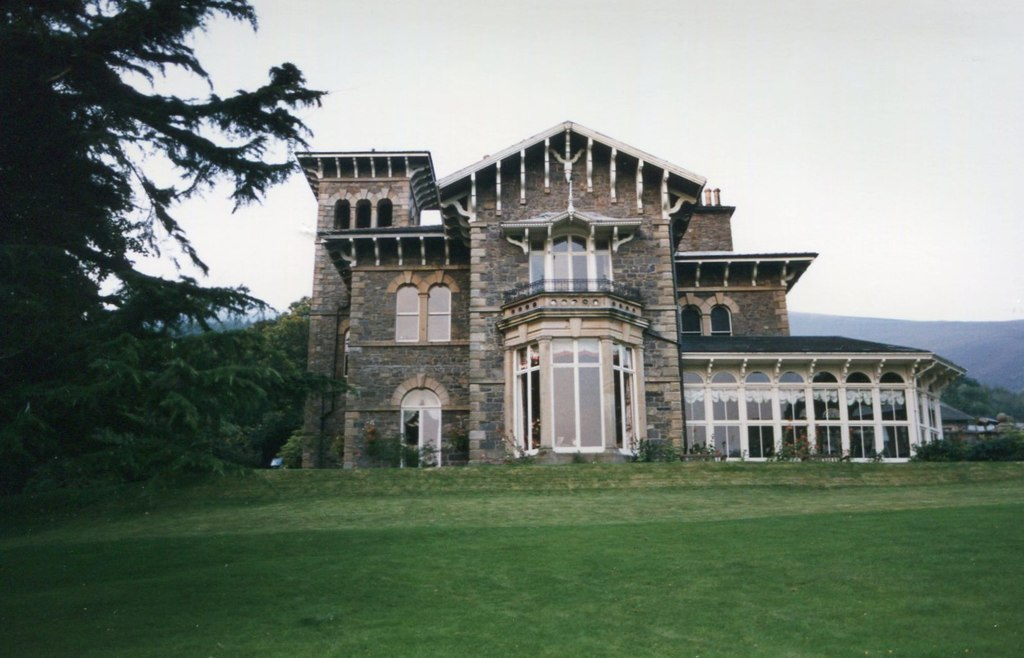
- Underscar Manor in 1987

- Location in Cumbria
- 54.6208°N 3.1316°W
- Location: Gale Road, Underskiddaw, Cumbria, England

History
- Built: 1856–1863
- Built for: William Oxley

Site notes
- Architect: Charles Verelst
- Architectural style: Italianate

Listed Building – Grade II
- Designated: 24 February 2000
- Reference no.: 1380116

Underscar Manor is a country house at Underskiddaw in Cumbria. It is a Grade II listed building.

== History ==
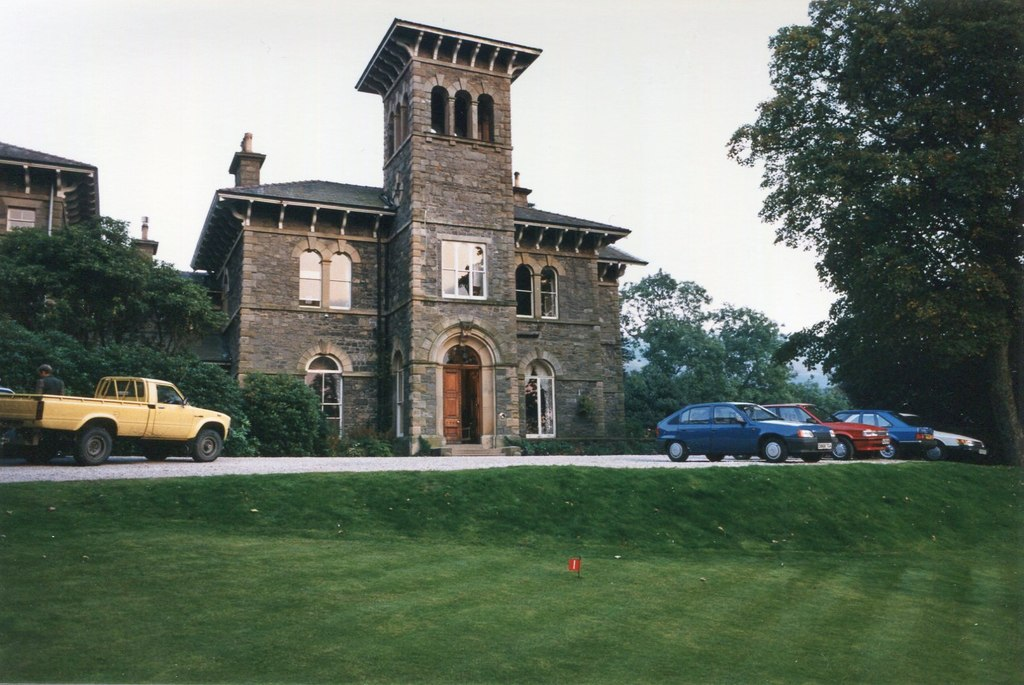
Underscar Manor in 1987

The house was designed by Charles Verelst for William Oxley, a Liverpool textile merchant, and was built in the Italianate style between 1856 and 1863. It came into the ownership of James Tait Black, a partner in the publishers A & C Black, in the early 20th century.

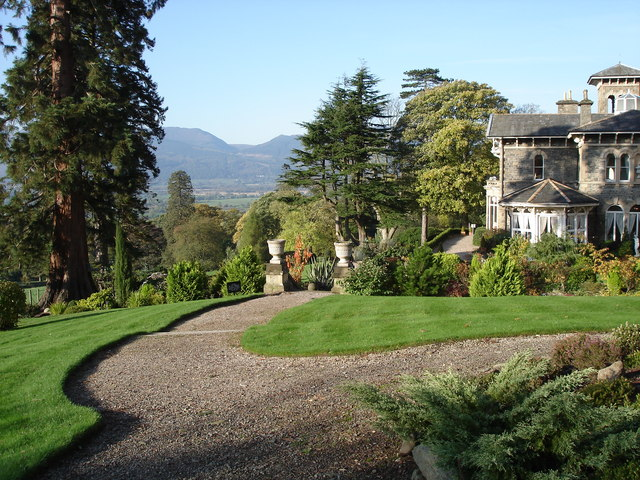
Hotel and gardens in 2005

The house was converted for use as a hotel in the 1970s. It was acquired by Derek and Pauline Harrison and their business partner Gordon Evans in 1990; customers included Jonathan Dimbleby, the broadcaster, and John Swannell, the photographer. The Queen and the Duke of Edinburgh visited the house in October 2008.

The house became a private home again when it was acquired by Alexander Mineev, a Russian oligarch, in 2010. Following Mineev's murder in Moscow in February 2014, the house was bought by Jonathan Brown, owner of a Maryport-based salmon smoking business, in August 2014.

== William Oxley ==
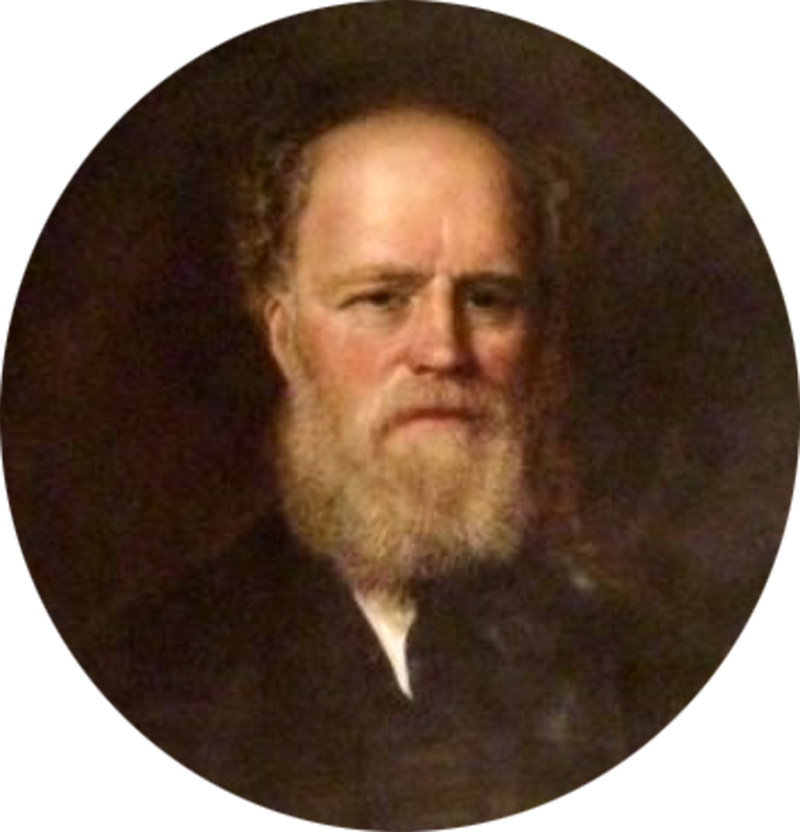
William Oxley

William Oxley (1803–1871) who built Underscar was born in 1803 in Wakefield. His father was John Oxley, a merchant of Wakefield and his mother was Margaret Potter, daughter of Samuel Potter Esq. of Whitehaven who was a banker. He moved to Liverpool and became a very successful merchant. In 1830 he married Hope Stewart the daughter of John Stewart of Blackburne Terrace. In the following year the couple had a son John Stewart Oxley and shortly after his birth his wife Hope died. In 1838 he married Anna Margaret Ponsonby who was the daughter of Captain John Ponsonby of Springfield near Whitehaven. The Captain later lived at Barrow House and Ormathwaite House near Keswick.

In 1857 William commissioned the famous architect Charles Reid to build the house. It took three and a half years to complete. He also hired the well-known landscape architect Edward Kemp to construct the gardens. Kemp described the house and garden in detail in a book he wrote.

A description of the new house was given in a newspaper of 1861. It read.

A great improvement has been made to Keswick by the completion of Underscar House which is an Italian mansion seated on the Applethwaite ascent to Skiddaw and upon an eminence far exceeding that of any other residence whence are commanded on all sides lake and mountain prospect unequalled for extent and picturesque sublimity. The mansion which is the seat of William Oxley Esq. of Liverpool stands on its own grounds of many acres and from its graceful design forms a prominent landmark on the landscape.

William died in 1871 and his wife Anna continued to live at the house until several years before her death in 1890. The local newspaper published a glowing obituary of her which can be read at this reference.

== See also ==
- Listed buildings in Underskiddaw
