= Listed buildings in Claughton, Merseyside =

Claughton is a suburb of Birkenhead, Wirral, Merseyside, England. It contains 25 buildings that are recorded in the National Heritage List for England as designated listed buildings, all of which are listed at Grade II. This grade is the lowest of the three gradings given to listed buildings and is applied to "buildings of national importance and special interest". The suburb is entirely residential, and was initially laid out for Sir William Jackson by Charles Reed in the 1840s and 1850s. Most of the listed buildings are houses from this development. The other listed buildings include a church, an art gallery and museum, a school (originally a house), and two pillar boxes.

Name and location	Photograph	Date	Notes
Aston Lodge; 53.38725°N 3.04400°W	—	c. 1840	A stuccoed house with a Welsh slate roof, probably by Charles Reed, in Tudor Gothic style. It has two storeys, and a symmetrical three-bay front, each bay being gabled. The central bay projects forward and has octagonal angle turrets and a doorway. In the left bay is a canted bay window. The windows are mullioned. On the right side is a late 19th-century polygonal conservatory.
Gateway, Aston Lodge; 53.38743°N 3.04359°W	—	c. 1840	The gateway is in stone with piers supporting a four-centred arch with a cornice and corbel heads. It contains a wooden gate, and above the arch is the inscription "Aston Lodge".
Kenyon Terrace, 1–15 Devonshire Road; 53.38744°N 3.03952°W	—	c. 1840	A terrace of eight stone houses with a Welsh slate roof, probably by Charles Reed, in Italianate style. They are symmetrical and in three storeys, with the outer and central sections protruding forward. The ground floor is rusticated, some houses have Ionic porches, others have pedimented doorcases with fanlights. The windows are sashes.
13 Charlesville; 53.38554°N 3.04304°W	—	c. 1840–48	A stuccoed house with a Welsh slate roof by Charles Reed. It has two storeys and a three-bay front, the pedimented central bay projecting slightly forward, and containing a lean-to porch. This is flanked by three-light windows under a segmental arch. The windows are casements, the central one in the upper floor having an entablature.
Kenyon Terrace, 17–31 Devonshire Road; 53.38732°N 3.04029°W	—	c. 1844–48	A terrace of eight stone houses with a Welsh slate roof, probably by Charles Reed, in Italianate style. They are symmetrical and in three storeys, with the outer and central sections protruding forward. The ground floor is rusticated, some houses have Ionic porches, others have pedimented doorcases with fanlights. The windows are sashes.
Kenyon Terrace, 33–47 Devonshire Road; 53.38719°N 3.04112°W	—	c. 1844–48	A terrace of eight stone houses with a Welsh slate roof, probably by Charles Reed, in Italianate style. They are symmetrical and in three storeys, with the outer and central sections protruding forward. The ground floor is rusticated, some houses have Ionic porches, others have pedimented doorcases with fanlights. The windows are sashes.
31 Grosvenor Road; 53.38831°N 3.04412°W	—	c. 1844–48	A stuccoed house with a Welsh slate roof by Charles Reed. It has two storeys and a symmetrical three-bay front. In the centre is a portico porch flanked by bay windows containing sashes. The windows in the upper floor are casements, the central one with an entablature on consoles.
4 Caroline Place; 53.38688°N 3.04394°W	—	c. 1845	A brick house with a Welsh slate roof, probably by Charles Reed. It has two storeys and a symmetrical three-bay front. The central entrance has a gabled pedimented porch and a segmental archway. The windows are sashes, those in the upper floor having small balconies.
24 and 26 Devonshire Road; 53.38731°N 3.04882°W	—	c. 1845	A pair of stuccoed brick houses with a Welsh slate roof, by Charles Reed. They are symmetrical, in two storeys, and each house has three bays. The outer bays project forward and are gabled with a single-storey canted bay window. The central bays of each house contain a pedimented porch, and in the inner bays are French windows. The other windows are casements, those in the upper floor being round-headed.
Springfield Lodge; 53.38702°N 3.04399°W	—	c. 1845	A stuccoed house with a Welsh slate roof probably by Charles Reed. It has two storeys and a three-bay front. In the centre is a portico porch flanked by mullioned and transomed casements with entablatures on consoles. The upper floor windows are similar. On the right side is a canted bay window.
28 and 30 Devonshire Road; 53.38771°N 3.04346°W	—	c. 1845–50	A pair of stuccoed brick houses with a Welsh slate roof, by Charles Reed. They are symmetrical, in two storeys, and each house has two bays. The outer bays project forward and have a single-storey canted bay window. The other windows have two lights, and the left hand house has a first floor balcony. The entrances are on the sides, and have porches with hipped roofs.
Landour; 53.38825°N 3.04632°W	—	1850	A brick house with stone dressings and a Welsh slate roof, probably by Walter Scott, in Jacobethan style. It has two storeys with attics, and is in a square plan. The entrance front has three bays, the outer ones with Dutch gables. The central doorway has a round-headed architrave and a fanlight. On the right side are two more gabled bays and a square bay window. Some windows are sashes, and others are mullioned and transomed.
40 and 42 Devonshire Place; 53.38731°N 3.04882°W	—	c. 1850	A pair of houses, probably by Charles Reed, in brick with stone dressings and a Welsh slate roof. They are symmetrical with two storeys, and each house has a two-bay front. The outer bays contain two-storey canted bay windows with an entablature containing a cartouche. The gabled inner bays are flanked by pilasters, with a three-light window in the ground floor and a sash window above. The entrances are on the sides.
32 and 34 Devonshire Road; 53.38773°N 3.04396°W	—	c. 1850	A pair of stone houses with hipped Welsh slate roofs, by Charles Reed. They are symmetrical, in two storeys, and each house has two bays. The outer bays contain a bow window, and the windows are mullioned and transomed. The entrances are on the sides.
36 Devonshire Road; 53.38780°N 3.04443°W	—	c. 1850	A brick house with rendered stone dressings and a hipped Welsh slate roof, by Charles Reed. It has two storeys and an attic, and a two-bay front. In the left bay is a canted bay window with a parapet and a pedimented window above. To the right is a three-light window, with a window in an architrave above. The porch is on the side.
7 Slatey Road; 53.38938°N 3.04223°W		c. 1850	A brick house with a Welsh slate roof, in two storeys with an attic and a three-bay front. The central doorway has a moulded architrave and a fanlight. Above it is a pedimented gable containing two round-arched windows. There are two canted bay windows on the right side. All the windows are sashes.
1–9 St Aidan's Terrace, 44 Forest Road; 53.39137°N 3.05453°W		c. 1850	A symmetrical terrace of nine houses, ashlar-faced over brick, with Welsh slate roofs. They are in three storeys with basements, and each house has a five-bay front. They have a central doorway with a Doric portico porch, and a canted bay window. The windows are sashes, those in the middle floor having alternate segmental and triangular pediments. The railings in front of the terrace are included in the listing.
38 and 40 Devonshire Road; 53.38784°N 3.04497°W	—	1853	A pair of brick houses with stone dressings and a Welsh slate roof, in Italianate style, by Charles Reed. They have two storeys, and each house has a three-bay front. The entrances are through porches on the sides, and there are recessed wings. The outer bays project forward and contain a bay window with a parapet. The windows are sashes.
10 and 12 Forest Road; 53.39408°N 3.05409°W		c. 1860	A pair of ashlar-faced houses with a roof mainly of Welsh slate. They have three storeys and three bays, the central bay projecting forward and gabled, and the outer bay recessed and containing the entrance. The doorway has an architrave and a fanlight, and above it is pedimented window. In the central bay of each house is a canted bay window with a balustraded parapet. The windows are sashes.
The Gables; 53.38815°N 3.04229°W		1865	A house designed by Walter Scott for his own use in Gothic style. It is in red brick, with dressings in blue and yellow brick, and has a Welsh slate roof. The house has three storeys and a two-bay entrance front. The right bay projects forward and is gabled, containing a porch with a segmental arch, voussoirs, and a parapet. On the right side are three gables, the central one the largest and containing ornate bargeboards. The windows are sashes.
Redcourt St Anselm's; 53.38705°N 3.04734°W	—	1876–78	This was originally a house called Redcourt, designed by Edmund Kirby, and later used as a school. It is in red brick with sandstone dressings and a tiled roof. The building is in simplified Tudor style, and has an irregular plan. It has three storeys and an entrance front of three bays containing a round-headed entrance in the right bay. The central bay projects forward and is gabled. The windows are mullioned, or mullioned and transomed.
Williamson Art Gallery and Museum; 53.38491°N 3.04028°W		1928	Designed by Leonard Hannaford and Herbert Thearle in Neo-Georgian style, the building is in brick with stone dressings. It is in a single storey around two internal courtyards. The entrance has Corinthian columns supporting an inscribed cornice. Other features include Corinthian pilasters, and round-arched blind niches.
