= Cecil Holden =

English cricketer

Cecil Holden (1 June 1865 – 22 August 1928) was an English cricketer active from 1886 to 1895 who played for Lancashire. He was born in West Derby and died in Claughton, Cheshire. He appeared in eight first-class matches as a righthanded batsman who bowled right arm medium pace. He scored 136 runs with a highest score of 45 and held six catches. He took one wicket with a best analysis of one for 29.
