= Runcorn Town Hall =

Municipal building in Runcorn, Cheshire, England

- Halton Grange; Boston Grange
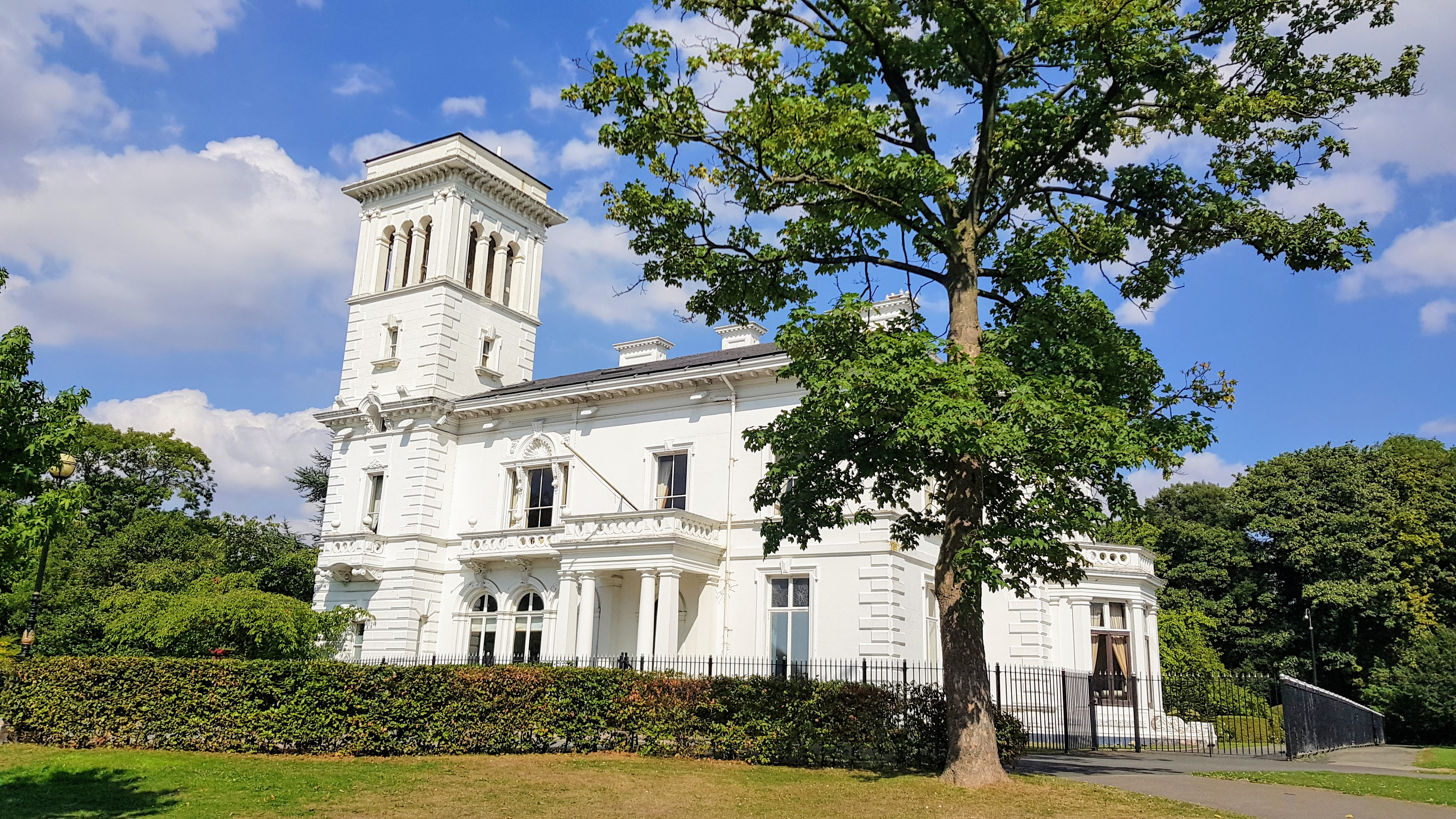
- Runcorn Town Hall, west aspect

- Location in Cheshire
- 53.3336°N 2.7238°W
- Location: Heath Road, Runcorn, Cheshire, England
- OS grid reference: SJ 518 820

History
- Built: 1853–56
- Built for: Thomas Johnson

Site notes
- Architect: Charles Verelst
- Architectural style: Italianate
- Owner: Halton Borough Council

Listed Building – Grade II
- Designated: 31 October 1983
- Reference no.: 1104859

Runcorn Town Hall is in Heath Road, Runcorn, Cheshire, England. It is recorded in the National Heritage List for England as a designated Grade II listed building. It was originally built as Halton Grange, a mansion for Thomas Johnson, a local industrialist. After passing through the ownership of two other industrialists, it was purchased in the 1930s by Runcorn Urban District Council and converted into their offices. Since 1974, it has been the meeting place for Halton Borough Council.

== History ==
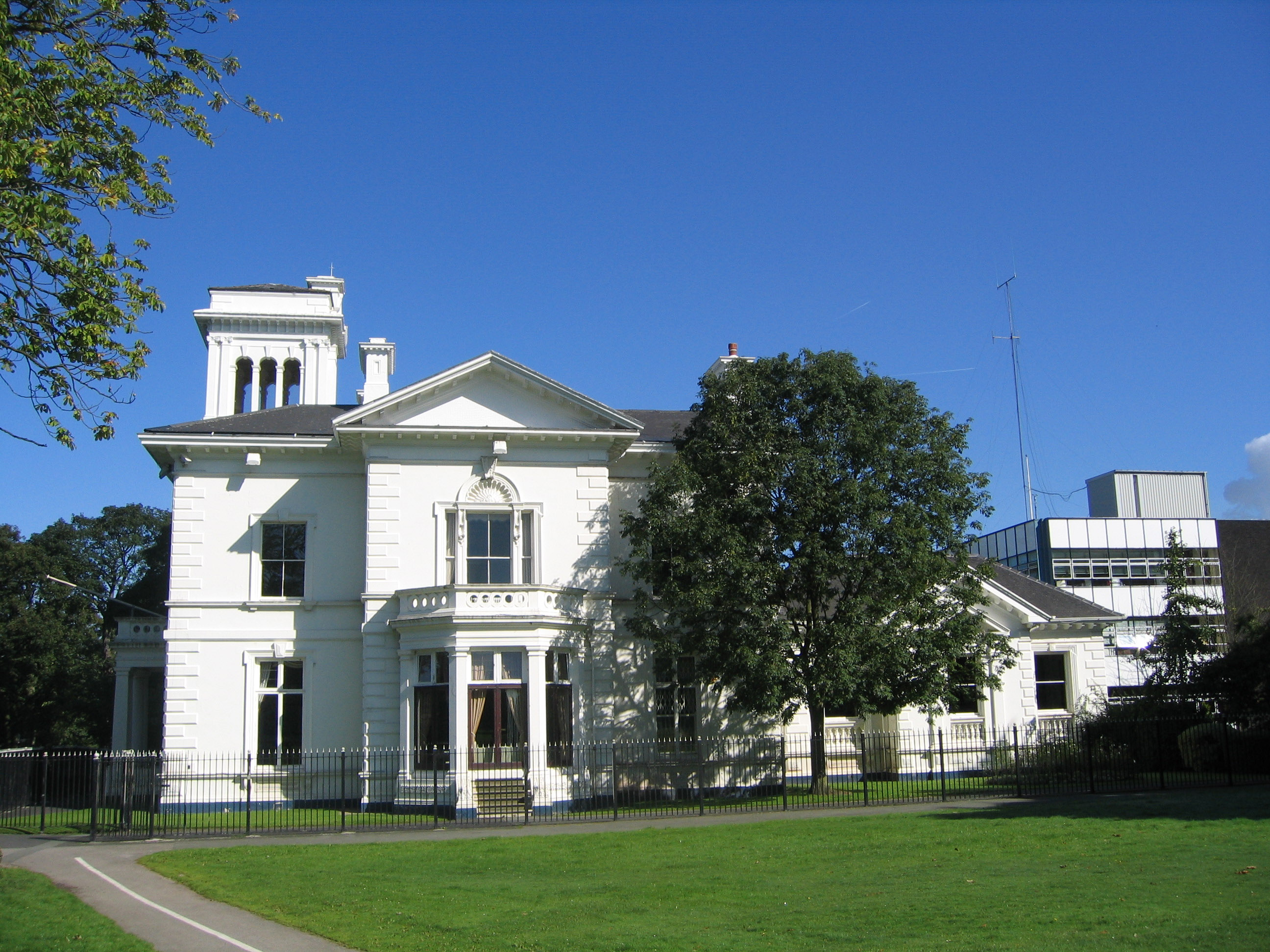
Runcorn Town Hall, south aspect, with the newer office block in the background to the right

In January 1854, the land on which the building stands was bought by Thomas Johnson from Francis Selkeld for £4,280 (equivalent to £410,000 in 2025). Thomas was the younger brother in the partnership of John & Thomas Johnson, soap and alkali manufacturers in Runcorn. In 1853–56, a mansion was built for Thomas on the land to a design by Charles Verelst (formerly Reed), with similar features to Verelst's earlier Mansion House in St Helens. The name of the mansion was Halton Grange and its gardens were planned by Edward Kemp. In the 1860s, the Johnson brothers became involved in the American Civil War by trying to break a naval blockade at Charleston but all their ships were sunk, resulting in a considerable loss of money. They eventually became bankrupt in 1871. In that year, Halton Grange and its surrounding farm were sold to Charles Hazlehurst for £10,428 (equivalent to £1,060,000 in 2025). Charles Hazlehurst was the junior partner in the other soap and alkali business in Runcorn, Hazlehurst & Sons. Charles died in 1878, leaving Halton Grange to his son, Charles Whiteway Hazlehurst, with a life interest to his wife, Julia, who died in 1903.

In 1904, the house was leased to Francis Boston, the owner of a tannery in Runcorn, who bought it in 1909 for £5,000 (equivalent to £510,000 in 2025). Francis Boston died in 1929, and the house and grounds were put up for auction. In 1931, Frederick Clare and Latham Ryder, local builders, bought part of the grounds for £1,975 (equivalent to £120,000 in 2025). In 1932, Runcorn Urban District Council bought the house and the remainder of the grounds, a total of 11 3/4 acres (4.8 ha), for £2,250 (equivalent to £140,000 in 2025). The following year, the building was converted into the offices of the Runcorn Urban District Council which relocated from Waterloo House in Waterloo Road. In 1964–65, an office block was built adjacent to the house and the house was adapted to become the civic suite. Following local government re-organisation in 1974, the building became the meeting place for Halton Borough Council. In April 2015, the Duke of Gloucester visited the town hall as part of celebrations for the 1,100th anniversary of the town.

== Description ==
=== Exterior ===
The exterior of the building is rendered and the roof is of slate. The building is in two storeys in the style of an Italianate villa, with a belvedere rising to four storeys. The authors of the Buildings of England series suggest it has similarities with Osborne House. The building has three bays on each front. The entrance front has a Tuscan portico with an open balustrade above it. The bay between the portico and the tower has a triple round-headed window with another balustrade above it. All corners have rusticated quoins. The upper level of the tower has triple openings which are flanked by pilasters on all faces. The ground floor windows are double casements and those above are sash windows.

=== Interior ===
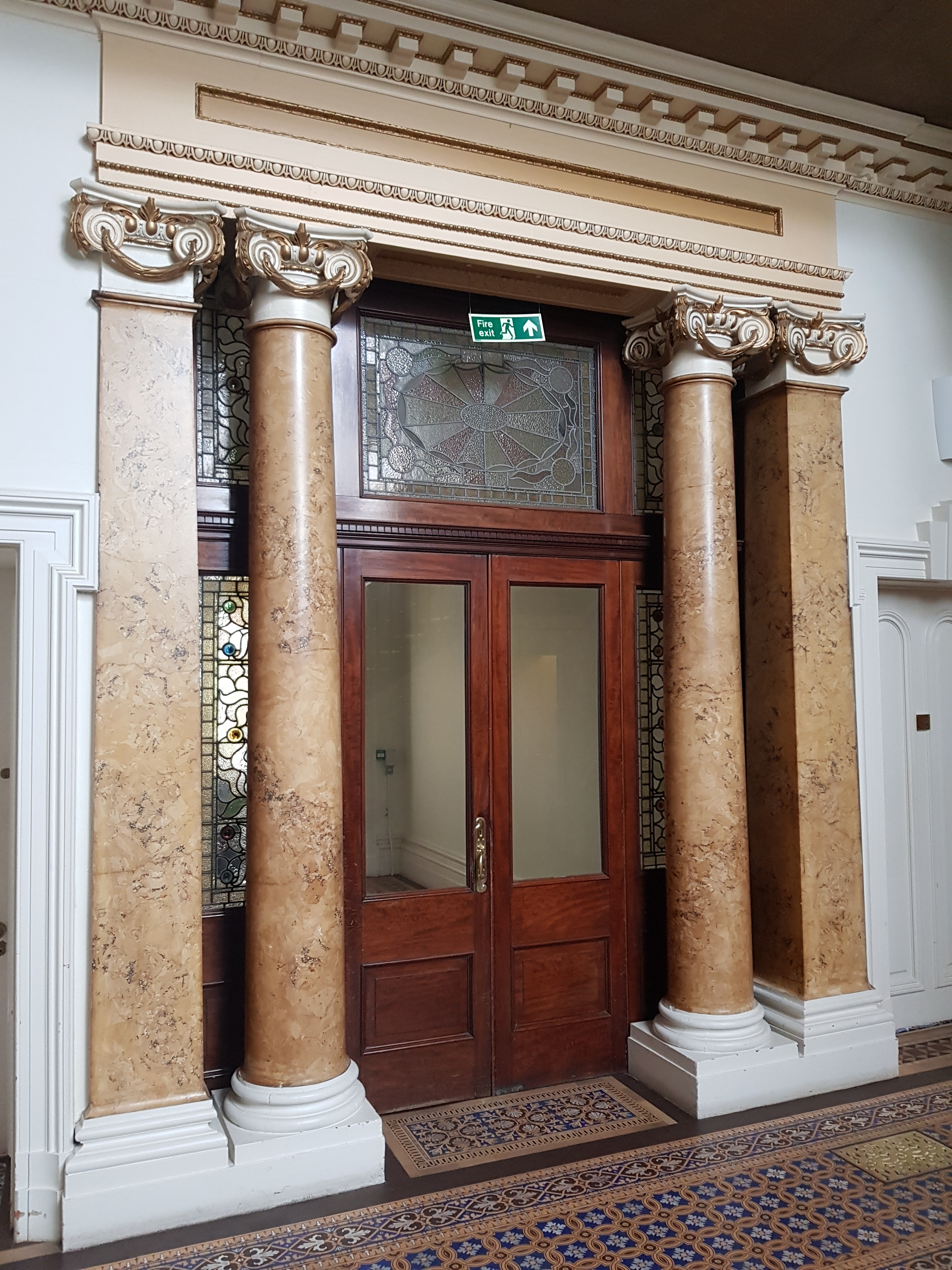
Marble columns inside the entrance to Runcorn Town Hall

The ground floor includes the mayor's parlour, a members' room and committee rooms. On the upper floor are reception rooms and a kitchen. A more modern council chamber has been added to the rear. The entrance hall has a mosaic floor, probably by Minton, in the centre of which is the figure of a young girl's head, possibly the daughter of Thomas Johnson. The mayor's parlour has an unusual feature, a window above the fireplace. This is concealed by a mirror which can be slid sideways. The chimney for the fireplace is built into the wall to the right of the window. The staircase is geometrical with cast iron balusters, over which is a large window glazed in a Venetian style. The stained glass in this window depicts Runcorn's coat of arms.

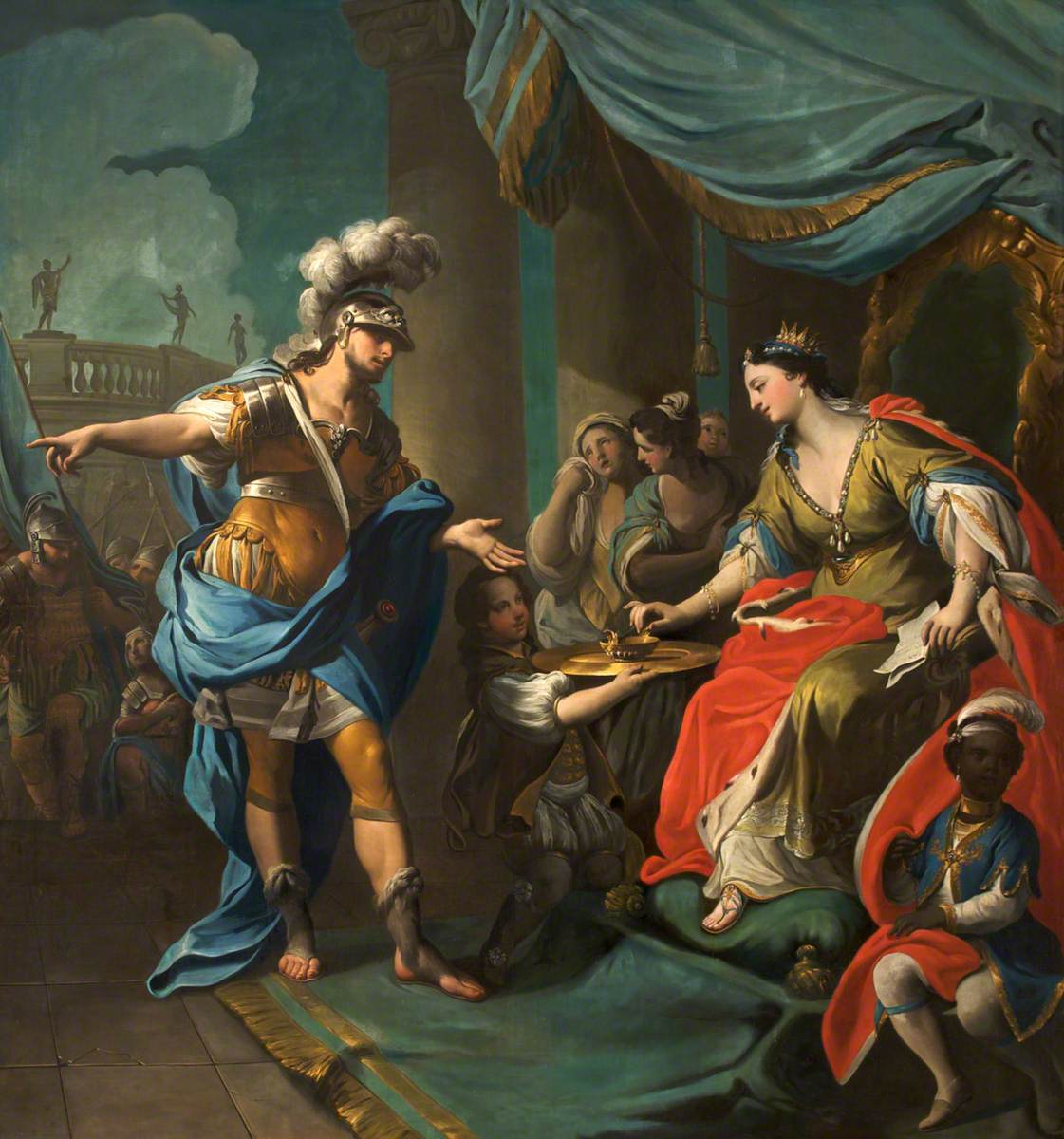
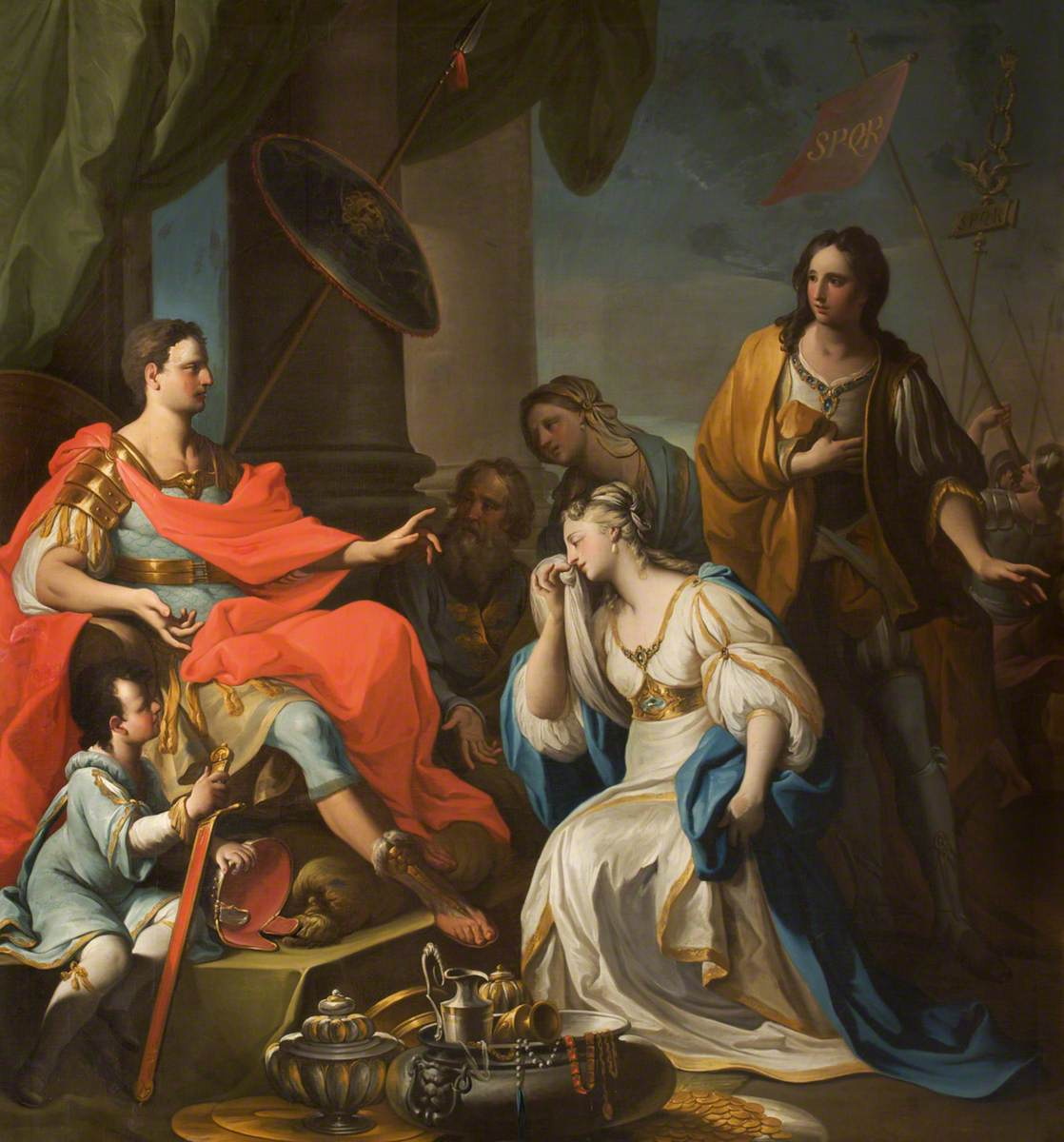
The paintings Sophonisba Taking Poison (left) and The Continence of Scipio (right) by Andrea Casali c.1743, hung above the staircase in Runcorn Town Hall

On the walls overlooking the staircase are two large paintings by Andrea Casali depicting the Continence of Scipio and Sophonisba Taking Poison. These paintings were commissioned in about 1743 by Richard Child, 1st Earl Tylney for Wanstead House. The frames were designed by William Kent. In 1822 the paintings were sold, and by 1825 they were hanging in the entrance hall of Eaton Hall. It is likely that they were purchased by Thomas Johnson around the time that the house was built. Elsewhere in the building are other paintings, many of which show Runcorn in former times.

== External features ==
Most of the area occupied by the gardens laid out by Edward Kemp forms a public park. The adjacent office block was reclad and refurbished in 2007. In 2008 a garden was established to the north of the town hall by the town of Tongling in China; it includes a traditional Chinese sculpture depicting acrobats.

== See also ==
- Listed buildings in Runcorn (urban area)
- List of works by Charles Reed
