= Shaw Hill =

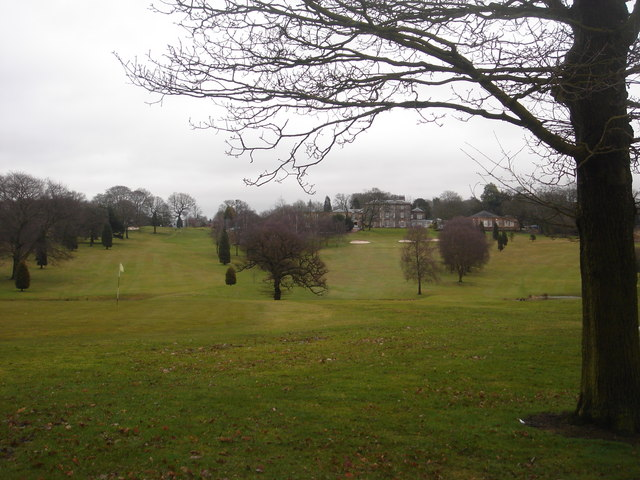
- Shaw Hill golf course and house

- Location within the Borough of Chorley

General information
- Type: Country house
- Location: Whittle-le-Woods, Lancashire, England
- Coordinates: 53.6827°N 2.6420°W
- Completed: Early 1840s

Technical details
- Material: Ashlar with hipped slate roofs
- Floor count: 3

Design and construction
- Architect: Charles Reed

Website
- www.shaw-hill.co.uk

Listed Building – Grade II
- Designated: 17 April 1967
- Reference no.: 1361849

Shaw Hill is an 18th-century country house in Whittle-le-Woods, Lancashire, England, standing in 192 acres of parkland some 3 miles (5 km) north of Chorley. The estate is now the Shaw Hill Hotel, Golf Club and Country Club.

The house is a three-storey building of ashlar with hipped slate roofs concealed by a parapet, and it incorporates elements of a smaller, earlier house. Three structures from the estate are separately recorded in the National Heritage List for England as designated Grade II listed buildings: the lodge, the gate piers, and the house itself.

== History ==
The Crosse family of East Lancashire first acquired property in the Chorley area around 1400 and built a house on the Whittle-le-Woods site in the 1700s. Richard Crosse Legh was the High Sheriff of Lancashire for 1807 and a deputy-lieutenant of Lancashire. He bequeathed Shaw Hill to his daughter Anna Mary Crosse, who in 1828 married Thomas Bright Ikin, who then adopted the Crosse name as his surname. He commissioned Charles Reed of Birkenhead to rebuild the existing house in the 1840s and asked William Sawrey Gilpin to landscape the estate. Thomas Bright Crosse was appointed High Sheriff of Lancashire for 1837 and was briefly MP for Wigan in 1841 (before his election was declared void).

After his death ownership of the property passed to his son Thomas Richard Crosse, Hon. Colonel of the 3rd and 4th Battalions, North Lancashire Regiment, who died in 1897. He had married Mary, the eldest daughter of the 4th Earl of Castle Stewart and had two daughters; Kathleen Mary and Ella Beatrice. Kathleen Mary never married and Ella Beatrice married John Ormerod Scarlet Thursby.

The estate is now operated as a country house hotel and golf club. The house is owned and run by the Stokes family and offers 30 bedrooms, a restaurant and an indoor swimming pool. The golf club was founded in 1923 and now maintains an 18-hole course.

== See also ==
- Listed buildings in Whittle-le-Woods
- List of works by Charles Reed
