= Deputy lieutenant =

Crown appointment in the UK

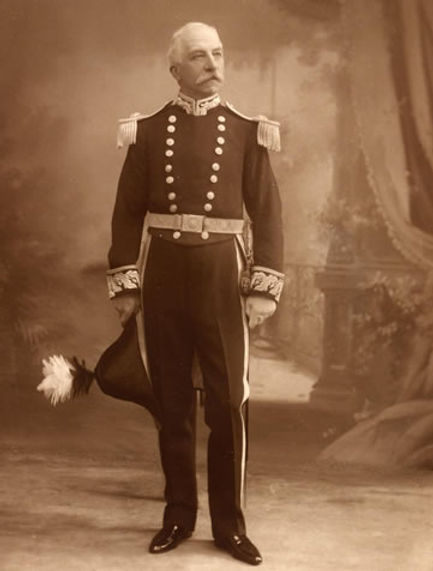
Harry Verelst in the uniform of a deputy lieutenant for the West Riding of Yorkshire in the early 20th century

In the United Kingdom, a deputy lieutenant is a Crown appointment and one of several deputies to the lord-lieutenant of a lieutenancy area – an English ceremonial county, Welsh preserved county, Scottish lieutenancy area, or Northern Irish county borough or county. Before the creation of the Irish Free State, all Irish counties had deputy lieutenants.

In formal style, the postnominal letters DL may be added after a deputy lieutenant's surname and other postnominals – e.g., "John Brown, CBE, DL". The position of Deputy Lieutenant is honorary and receives no remuneration.

== Overview ==
Deputy lieutenants are nominated by a lord-lieutenant to assist with their duties (see the Lieutenancies Act 1997). Deputy lieutenants receive their commission of appointment via the appropriate government minister by command of the British monarch. In England and Wales, since November 2001, the minister responsible for most appointments is the Lord Chancellor, with exceptions such as the Chancellor of the Duchy of Lancaster. In Scotland, since July 1999, it has been the Scottish Ministers.

Decades ago, a county could have as few as three deputy lieutenants. Today, there may be more than a dozen, as their number is proportional to the county's population. Deputy lieutenants tend to be people who either have served the local community, or have a history of public service in other fields.

Deputy lieutenants represent the lord-lieutenant in his or her absence, including at local ceremonies and official events, from opening exhibitions to inductions of clergy (as requested by the Church of England). They must live within their lieutenancy area, or within seven miles (11 km) of its boundary. Their commissions do not terminate with a change of lord-lieutenant, and they are not legally required to retire at the age of 75. However, in practice at that age their names are moved to a Supplemental List, so that they continue in office, but are no longer called upon to perform any duties.

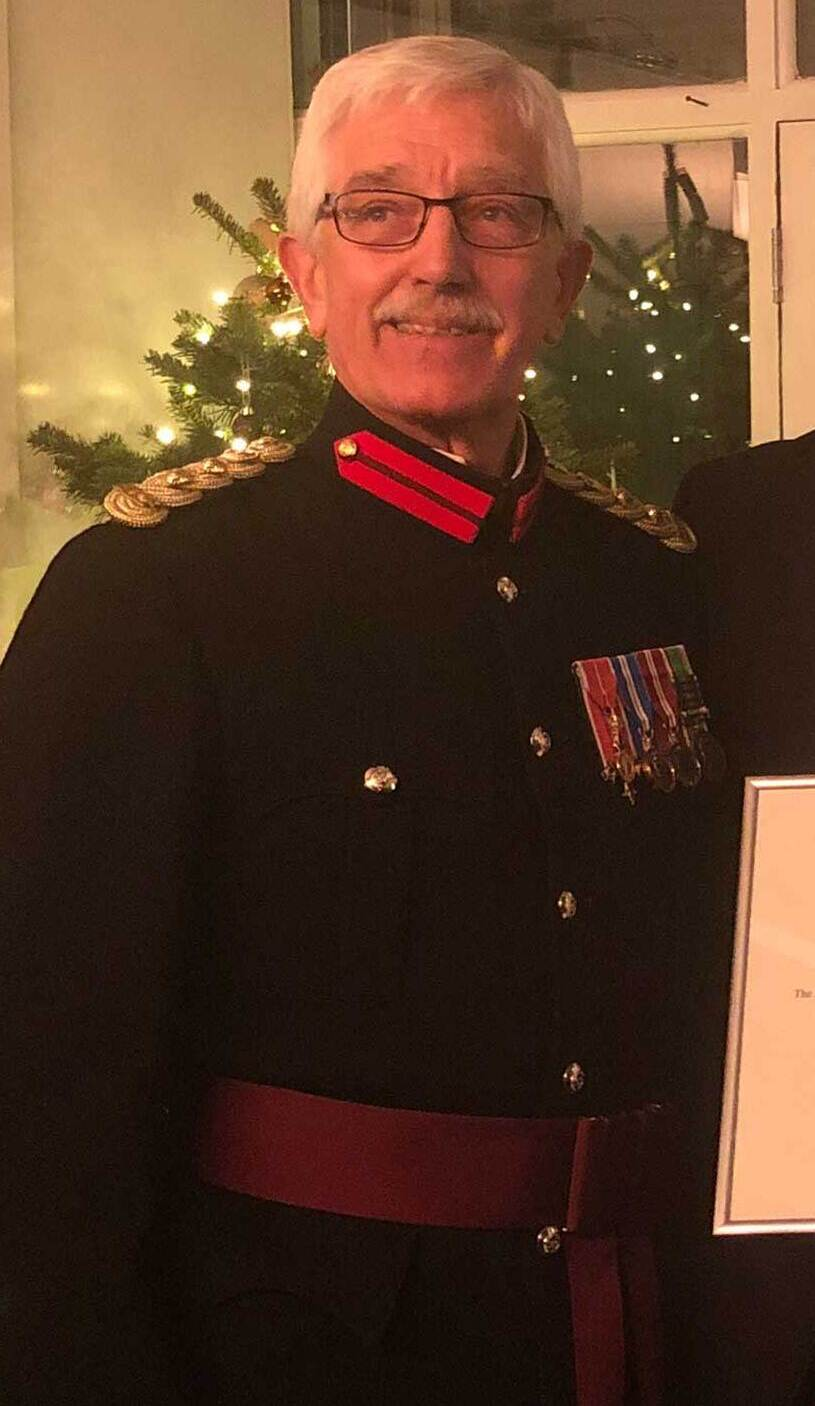
Colonel John S. Wilson, OBE, DL, Vice Lord-Lieutenant of Derbyshire, wearing his uniform in 2020

One of the serving deputy lieutenants is appointed to be vice lord-lieutenant, who in most circumstances will stand in for a lord-lieutenant who cannot be present. The appointment as vice lord-lieutenant usually expires upon the retirement of the lord-lieutenant who made the choice. Generally, the vice lord-lieutenant would then revert to being a regular deputy lieutenant.

Unlike the office of lord-lieutenant, which is an appointment in the gift of the Sovereign, the position of deputy lieutenant is an appointment of the Sovereign's appointee, and therefore not a direct appointment of the Sovereign per se.

Deputy lieutenant commissions are published by the clerk of the lieutenancy, as a State Appointment, in either the London Gazette or the Edinburgh Gazette, as appropriate, with the names of the persons appointed deputy lieutenants for that county or area, and the dates of their commissions.

== See also ==
- Custos rotulorum
- List of deputy lieutenants
