= Listed buildings in Whittle-le-Woods =

Buildings listed in national heritage of England

Whittle-le-Woods is a civil parish in the Borough of Chorley, Lancashire, England. The parish contains 35 buildings that are recorded in the National Heritage List for England as designated listed buildings. Of these, one is listed at Grade II*, the middle grade, and the others are at Grade II, the lowest grade. The parish, which was formerly mainly rural, contains the village of Whittle-le-Woods, and agricultural land has been used for residential development in and around the village. Many of the listed buildings are, or originated as, farmhouses and farm buildings, some of which contain former loomshops that were used for the weaving industry. There are two former country houses and associated structures that are listed and which have been converted for other uses. The Leeds and Liverpool Canal passes through the parish, as does the abandoned southern section of the Lancaster Canal; there are a number of listed structures associated with both of these. Also in the parish, and listed, are two churches and associated structures, smaller houses and cottages, a row of almshouses, a bridge over the River Lostock, a gun emplacement, and a public house.

== Key ==
Grade	Criteria
II*	Particularly important buildings of more than special interest
II	Buildings of national importance and special interest

== Buildings ==
Name and location	Photograph	Date	Notes	Grade
Lisieux Hall; 53.68824°N 2.64857°W	—	c. 1608	Originally a country house, it was altered in the early 19th century, and from the 1930s has been used as a care home. It is in sandstone with slate roofs, in two storeys and attics, and has a plan of three parallel ranges. There is a symmetrical front of seven bays containing a porch with four Tuscan columns, a frieze, and a moulded cornice. Inside the porch is a doorway with engaged Ionic columns. On the left side are the remains of 17th-century mullioned windows. On the right side are canted bay windows, one in two storeys.	II
Croston's Farmhouse; 53.67953°N 2.62999°W	—	17th century (probable)	A sandstone farmhouse with a slate roof in two storeys. Originally with two bays, a third bay was added later. In the ground floor is a sliding sash window and a mullioned window, and in the upper floor the windows are casements. At the rear is an outshut with mullioned windows. Inside is a full-height timber-framed partition.	II
Lock Farmhouse and workshop 53.68373°N 2.62093°W	—	17th century	The former farmhouse wa extended in the 18th century with the addition of a loomshop. It is in sandstone with a roof mainly of slate with some stone-slate, and other than the loomshop it is in two storeys. The building has a T-shaped plan with a three-bay main range and an extension to the rear, including the loomshop. On the front is a doorway with a datestone above, and sash windows. On the rear and in the loomshop are mullioned windows.	II
Jones' Farmhouse; 53.68403°N 2.65273°W	—	17th century	A stone farmhouse with a slate roof, with two storeys. Originally with three bays, a shippon was added at the left end. It has a two-storey porch, and one mullioned window, the other windows being modern casements.	II
Rotheram Top Farmhouse; 53.67644°N 2.63592°W	—	17th century	A sandstone farmhouse with a slate roof in two storeys with a three-bay front, later extended at the left end. On the front is a two-storey gabled porch containing a doorway with a large lintel. The windows have been altered, but some mullions remain. At the rear is an outshut, and inside the farmhouse is an inglenook and a bressumer.	II
Moss Lane Farmhouse; 53.67844°N 2.62555°W	—	Late 17th century	A farmhouse that was extended in about 1800 by the addition of a cartshed and stable to the right and a loomshop to the left. The building is in sandstone and roofed in stone-slate with some slate. The farmhouse has two storeys and three bays, a two-storey gabled porch, and mostly mullioned windows. The loomshop is slightly lower, with two storeys, each containing rows of square windows. The cartshed and stable have a segmental arch with a keystone, and a stable door. Inside the farmhouse are back-to-back inglenooks and bressumers, and timber-framed partitions.	II*
Sibbering Farmhouse; 53.68156°N 2.64881°W	—	Late 17th century (probable)	The farmhouse was extended in the 19th century. It is in stone with roofs of stone-slate and slate. It has two storeys, and the original part has two bays with mullioned windows. On the front is a modern timber-framed porch. The extensions form a parallel range at the rear.	II
Carwood House Farmhouse; 53.68899°N 2.63388°W	—	18th century (probable)	A former farmhouse, later converted into two dwellings, it is in gritstone with a slate roof. The building has two storeys and three bays, with a lean-to extension on the right. On the front is a single-storey gabled porch. The first bay contains sliding sash windows and the remains of a mullioned window; the other windows are casements.	II
Hill Top Farm South; 53.69274°N 2.62692°W	—	18th century (probable)	A barn is attached to the left of the former farmhouse, which is in stone with a slate roof. The house has 2 1/2 storeys, and a two-bay front. On the front is a single-storey gabled porch and windows, one of which is mullioned. The barn also has two bays and a double doorway.	II
Barn, Lock Farm; 53.68363°N 2.62072°W	—	18th century (probable)	A sandstone barn with a slate roof, it has a rectangular four-bay plan. The barn contains a large segmental-headed wagon entrance, doorways, and ventilation holes.	II
School Lane Bridge; 53.68573°N 2.63845°W		18th century (probable)	The bridge carries School Lane over the River Lostock. It is in sandstone and consists of a single segmental arch with voussoirs. It has curved parapet walls with rounded coping.	II
Lower Copthurst Farmhouse; 53.68841°N 2.61493°W	—	1764	A stone farmhouse with a slate roof in two storeys and with two bays. Above the central doorway is a lintel containing a panel decorated with a scroll and inscribed with initials and the date. The windows are mullioned.	II
Sundial; 53.68218°N 2.61310°W	—	1767	The sundial is in the churchyard of St Chad's Church. It is in stone, and consists of a tapering column on a cylindrical pedestal standing on a square base. On the top is cap with a brass plate and gnomon. The plate is inscribed with lines leading to various foreign cities.	II
Dolphin Farmhouse; 53.68667°N 2.63497°W	—	Late 18th century (probable)	A stone farmhouse with a slate roof in two storeys. Originally in two bays, a stable was added to the right, and later a rear extension was built. The door has a rectangular lintel, and the windows are casements.	II
Seven cottages, Waterhouse Green; 53.68545°N 2.63786°W	—	1776	Originally seven cottages, later divided into six dwellings, they are in sandstone, (one cottage rendered), with slate roofs. Each cottage has a plain stone doorcase, and one window in each floor. One cottage has a porch, and most of the windows are sashes.	II
The Roebuck; 53.68535°N 2.63860°W		1789	A public house in stone with a slate roof, it has two storeys and a three-bay front. In the centre is a doorway with a moulded architrave and a moulded open segmental pediment. Above the doorway is a datestone. There are single-storey extensions on the left end and at the rear.	II
St Chad's Church; 53.68230°N 2.61278°W		1791	A Roman Catholic church that was extended in the 1850s or 1860s with the building of a new nave, a sanctuary, and a tower, and the sanctuary was further extended in 1888. In 1959 the church was damaged by fire. It is built in sandstone with a slate roof, and has a cruciform plan, consisting of a nave, transepts, a chancel, and a south tower. The tower is in Italianate Romanesque style, and has a low pyramidal roof.	II
Former canal bridge 53.69209°N 2.63470°W		1790s	The bridge carries Chorley Old Road over a disused portion of the southern end of the Lancaster Canal. It is in stone, and consists of a single elliptical arch with a keystone, and a parapet with rounded coping.	II
1 and 1A Waterhouse Green; 53.68561°N 2.63762°W	—	1798	A house, later divided into two dwellings, in sandstone with a slate roof, with two storeys and a symmetrical front. Above the central doorway is an inscribed plaque, and there are two sash windows on each floor. On the left side, which is rendered, are two doors and three windows.	II
Carwood House; 53.68884°N 2.63478°W	—	1798	A stone house with a slate roof. It has two storeys and a symmetrical two-bay front. Above the central doorway is a datestone, and the windows are casements.	II
Moss Lane Bridge; 53.67860°N 2.62035°W		c. 1800	This is Bridge No.80, carrying Moss Lane (B6229 road) over the Leeds and Liverpool Canal. It is in stone and consists of a single elliptical arch, and has triple keystones, and parapets with rounded coping.	II
East portal, Whittle Hills Tunnel; 53.69088°N 2.62949°W	—	1801–03	The east portal of the tunnel carrying the former southern part of the Lancaster Canal is in sandstone. It consists of a semicircular arch with rusticated voussoirs and triple keystones.	II
West portal, Whittle Hills Tunnel; 53.69154°N 2.63218°W	—	1801–03	The west portal of the tunnel carrying the former southern part of the Lancaster Canal is in sandstone. It consists of a semicircular arch with rusticated voussoirs and triple keystones.	II
Fourth Lock Bridge; 53.68364°N 2.62018°W		1816	This is Bridge No. 81, carrying Town Lane over the Leeds and Liverpool Canal. It is in stone and consists of a single semicircular arch crossing the lower approach to the Fourth Lock. It has buttress piers, and parapets with flat coping.	II
Top Lock Bridge; 53.68696°N 2.61337°W		1816	This is Bridge No. 82, carrying Lower Copthurst Lane over the Leeds and Liverpool Canal. It is in stone and consists of a single segmental arch crossing the lower approach to Top Lock. It has buttress piers, and parapets with flat coping.	II
Top Lock; 53.68705°N 2.61311°W		1816	This is the top of seven locks linking the Leeds and Liverpool Canal with the southern branch of the Lancaster Canal. It is built in gritstone, and has wooden gates with iron sluices, and a wooden footbridge. Its upper entrance is in the parish of Heapey.	II
Seven canal locks 53.68523°N 2.61873°W		1816	The seven locks linked the Leeds and Liverpool Canal with the southern branch of the Lancaster Canal. They are all built in gritstone, and each has wooden gates with iron sluices, and a wooden footbridge.	II
Lock keeper's office 53.68363°N 2.62040°W	—	c. 1816 (probable)	The former office is built on a slope adjacent to the fourth lock of the Leeds and Liverpool Canal. It is in stone with a slate roof, and consists of a single cell, with one storey on the north side facing the road and two storeys at the rear. The east gable end contains a doorway approached by a step, and a fixed window. On the south side is a basement doorway and two windows.	II
Stable block, Lisieux Hall; 53.68860°N 2.64871°W	—	Early 19th century (probable)	The stable block is in sandstone with a hipped slate roof, and is in two storeys. It has an L-shaped plan with a symmetrical five-bay front. The front has a central pedimented gable, a segmental-arched wagon entrance with a keystone, and windows. On the left side is another wagon entrance, and a tablet containing a coat of arms.	II
Gate piers, Shaw Hill; 53.68400°N 2.63942°W	—	Early 19th century	The gate piers are at the entrance of the drive to the hall. They are in stone, have a square section, with plain pillars and low pyramidal caps.	II
Lodge, Shaw Hill; 53.68404°N 2.63954°W	—	Early 19th century	The lodge at the entrance of the drive to the hall is in rusticated stone with hipped slate roofs. It is in a single storey and has a T-shaped plan. The front facing the drive is pedimented with paired Ionic columns, and has a doorway with a moulded architrave. On the rear ranges are pilasters and pediments.	II
1, 3, 4 and Hilltop; 53.68335°N 2.63782°W	—	1841	A row of six almshouses. later converted into four dwellings. They are in stone with a slate roof, and in two storeys. Each house originally had one bay with a door, and a window in each floor; two doors have been converted into windows. There is a continuous outshut at the rear, and on the front is an inscribed panel.	II
Shaw Hill; 53.68269°N 2.64213°W	—	Early 1840s	A country house incorporating parts of an earlier house, later a golf club. It is in stone with a hipped slate roof, and has a square plan, three storeys, and five bays on each side. The entrance front is on the north side and has a porch with a Roman Doric colonnade. On the west front is a full height bow window. All the windows are sashes.	II
Church of St John the Evangelist; 53.68849°N 2.63979°W		1880–82	The church, designed by Myres, Veevers and Myres in Early English style, replaced a Commissioners' church previously on the site. It is in stone with slate roofs, and consists of a nave, a south aisle, a north transept, an apsidal chancel, and a tower in the angle of the transept and the chancel. The tower has three stages, with buttresses, a two-storey stair turret, a north doorway, louvred bell openings, gargoyles, and an embattled parapet with crocketed pinnacles surmounted by finials.	II
Bofors gun emplacement and attached pillbox 53.68231°N 2.63355°W	—	1940	This was built to defend the Royal Ordnance Factory at Chorley. Built in brick and concrete, it consists of a gun emplacement for a Bofors 40 mm gun, and a Type 23 pillbox. The pit for the emplacement is circular and about 4.57 metres (15.0 ft) in diameter. The pillbox has a rectangular plan.	II
