= Edward Kemp (landscape architect) =

English landscape architect and author

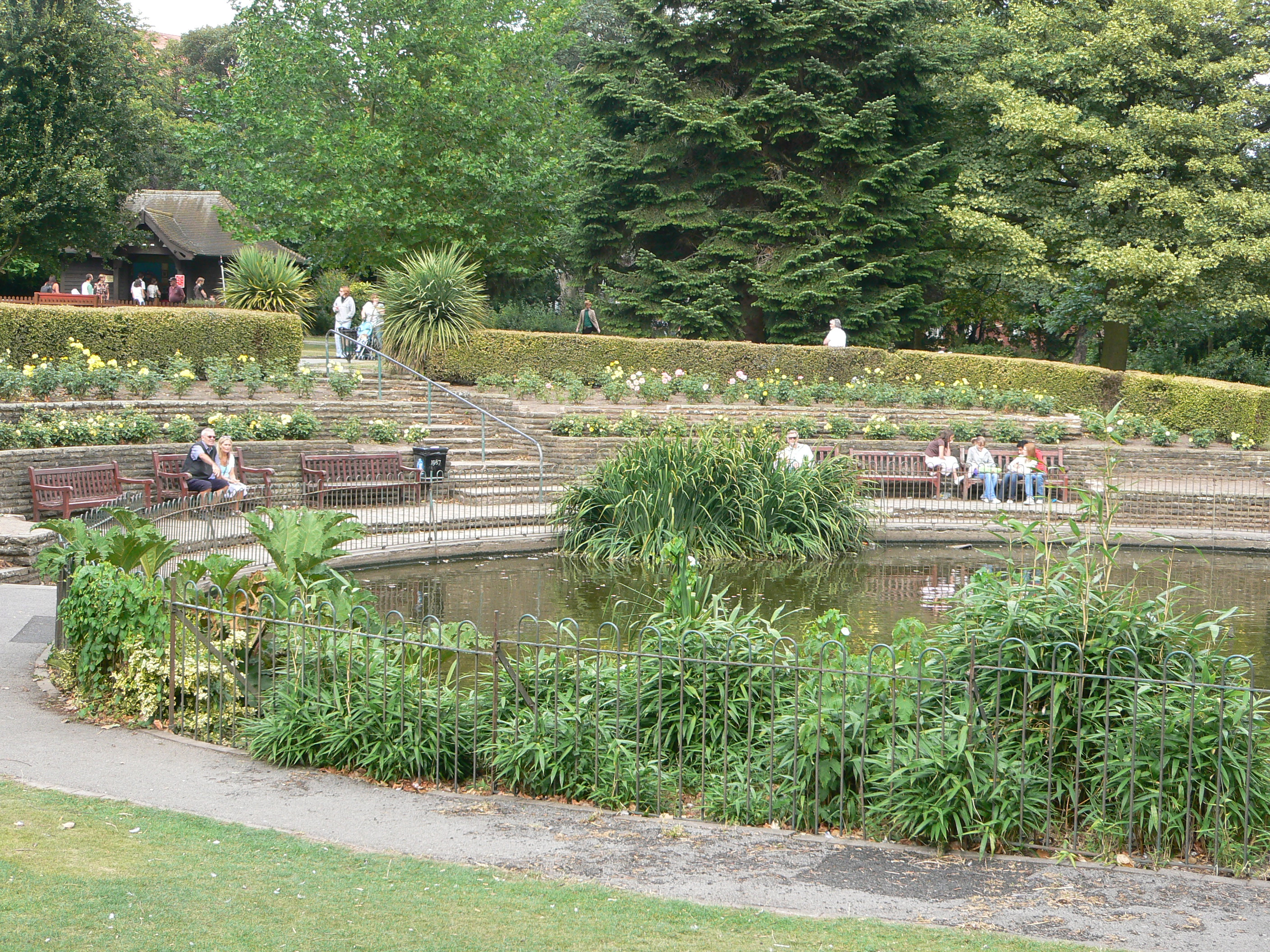
Grosvenor Park, Chester

Edward Kemp (25 September 1817 – 1 March 1891) was an English landscape architect and an author. Together with Joseph Paxton and Edward Milner, Kemp became one of the leaders in the design of parks and gardens during the mid-Victorian era in England.

== Biography ==
Kemp was born at Streatham, Surrey (now Lambeth), the son of Charles Kemp, a tailor, and his wife, Ann. Nothing is known about his education or early career. In the 1830s he worked with Edward Milner as a garden apprentice at Chatsworth House in Derbyshire under Joseph Paxton. In 1841 Kemp was living back in Streatham, giving his occupation in the census of that year as "gardener". Around that time he was involved with botanical and gardening publications, including The Gardening Magazine. In August 1843 the Improvement Commissioners of Birkenhead appointed Paxton to plan and construct Birkenhead Park. This was the first park to have been provided in Britain at public expense. Paxton appointed Kemp to be superintendent of the park, and Kemp took up this post in September 1843 when he was aged 25. Paxton was responsible for the overall planning and design, while Kemp was involved with the day to day implementation of the plans. By the summer of 1845 Paxton's work was more or less complete, and he recommended to the Commissioners that Kemp be retained as superintendent and to be provided with a residence; this was accepted.

In September 1845 Kemp took leave of absence to marry Sophia, daughter of Henry Bailey who had been park steward and gardener to the Spencer family at Althorp House. When Kemp returned to Birkenhead, his work was not fully occupying his time, and he became involved with planning a residential park estate, Carlett Park, at Eastham in the Wirral. The plans were not realised, and the Commissioners were unhappy that Kemp had become involved in private practice. Birkenhead Park was opened officially in April 1847, and in 1849 the Commissioners decided that a superintendent of parks was no longer required. However Kemp negotiated a settlement that he should work for no salary, but remain in his residence at Italian Lodge plus be given a small plot of land for him to cultivate for his needs. This was agreed, but Kemp had to find sources of income; this was to result in his becoming an author and a landscape gardener.

Kemp's first recorded commission was in 1849 when he designed a rose garden for James Barratt on the grounds of Lymm Hall, Lymm, Cheshire. The following year he worked with the architect Charles Verelst to design the garden at Stanacres (now Thornton Court) in Raby. Also in 1850 came Kemp's first publication, How to Lay Out a Small Garden. Following this came a succession of garden designs and publications. In 1858 a second edition of his book was published (now entitled How to Lay Out a Garden) and, although he was still working for the park, the Commissioners reviewed the agreement to provide him with free accommodation. Kemp then agreed to build a house for himself adjoining the park, and he moved into this house (now 74 Park Road West) in 1860.

Kemp's clients were mainly the newly rich, but he also gained commissions for the designs of parks and cemeteries. These included Flaybrick Hill Cemetery in Birkenhead, Grosvenor Park in Chester, Congleton Park in Congleton, and Queen's Park in Crewe. Kemp's work influenced other garden designers, including Thomas Hayton Mawson, who designed Hanley Park in Stoke-on-Trent. Kemp died at his home in Birkenhead Park in 1891 and was buried in Flaybrick Cemetery. His estate amounted to nearly £10,500 (equivalent to £1,150,000 in 2025).

== Publications ==
- Kemp, Edward (1850). How to Lay Out a Small Garden: intended as a general guide to amateurs in choosing, forming or improving and estate (from a quarter of an acre to thirty acres in extent), with reference to both design and execution (1st ed.). London: Bradbury and Evans.
- Kemp, Edward (1850). The Handbook of Gardening: for the use of all persons who possess a garden of limited extent. London: Bradbury and Evans.
- Kemp, Edward (1851). The Parks, Gardens, etc. of London and its Suburbs: described and illustrated for the guidance of strangers. London: John Weale.
- Kemp, Edward (1858). How to Lay Out a Garden: intended as a general guide in choosing, forming, or improving an estate (from a quarter of an acre to an hundred acres in extent), with reference to both design and execution (2nd ed.). London: Bradbury and Evans.
- Kemp, Edward (1862). Description of the Gardens at Biddulph Grange: abridged from the account published in the Gardeners' Chronicle in the years 1857–62. London: Bradbury and Evans.
- Kemp, Edward (1864). How to Lay Out a Garden (3rd ed.). London: Bradbury and Evans.
- Kemp, Edward (1911). Waugh (ed.). Landscape Gardening, or How to Lay Out a Garden: Principles, Styles and Practical Considerations, from the author's everyday intercourse with gentlemen who are either laying out new grounds or are seeking to amend errors in design formerly committed (4th ed.). New York and London: John Wiley and Sons.

== Works ==
Key to the Grades in the list
Grade	Criteria
II*	Parks and gardens that are particularly important, of more than special interest
II	Parks and gardens of special interest, warranting every effort to preserve them

List of the gardens and other works, locations, year of construction, and notes.
Name and town or village	County and coordinates	Photograph	Date	Notes and present state
Birkenhead Park; Birkenhead	Merseyside; 53.393°N 3.041°W	—	1843	For Birkenhead Improvement Commissioners. The park plan was designed by Joseph Paxton and the building was supervised by Kemp. Designated a conservation area in 1977 and declared a Grade I listed landscape by English Heritage in 1995.
Carlett Park; Eastham	Merseyside; 53.3202°N 2.9616°W	—	1846	For William Laird, the 3rd son of shipbuilder William Laird. The park was laid out under Kemp’s supervision. Kemp's landscaping has been incorporated into Eastham Lodge Golf Course.
Lymm Hall; Lymm	Cheshire; 53.3798°N 2.4765°W	—	1849	This was Kemp's first completed commission, for James Barratt. It consisted of a flower (or rose) garden. Its present condition is unknown.
Stanacres; Thornton Hough	Merseyside; 53.3171°N 3.0337°W	—	1850	Designed for Owen Jones, Liverpool timber merchant. Now Thornton Court. Its present condition is not known.
Lytham Hall; Lytham St Annes	Lancashire; 53.7442°N 2.9765°W		c. 1850	Laid out the drive.
Limegrove; Chester	Cheshire; 53.1882°N 2.8803°W	—	1853	Designed for Robert Frost, Chester flour miller, in Lower Park Road, Queen's Park, Chester, next door to Redcliff (now Lindengrove). The present state is not known. Plan and description is in How to Lay Out a Garden (3rd ed.).
Redcliff; Chester	Cheshire; 53.1882°N 2.8803°W	—	1853	Designed for Thomas Gibbons Frost, Chester flour miller, in Lower Park Road, Queen's Park, Chester, next door to Limegrove. The present state is not known. Plan and description is in How to Lay Out a Garden (3rd ed.).
Halton Grange; Runcorn	Cheshire; 53.3330°N 2.7219°W		1853–54	Designed for Thomas Johnson, soap and alkali manufacturer of John & Thomas Johnson. Now a public park adjacent to Runcorn Town Hall. Most of the garden as planned by Kemp has been destroyed.
Capernwray Hall; Carnforth	Lancashire; 54.1427°N 2.6965°W		1855	For the Marton family.
Park Place; Frodsham	Cheshire; 53.2924°N 2.7300°W	—	1855	Commissioned by Joseph Stubs, a manufacturer of engineers' tools in Warrington. The house was later known as Castle Park and the gardens are a public park. The essential elements of Kemp's design are still present.
Norley Hall; Norley	Cheshire; 53.2522°N 2.6540°W	—	1855–56	For Samuel Woodhouse. Present condition not known.
Mollington Banastre; Mollington	Cheshire; 53.2165°N 2.9185°W	—	1856	For Philip Stapleton Humberston, Mayor of Chester and Member of Parliament for Chester. The house is currently a hotel, and at least some of the garden remains. Description and partial plan is in How to Lay Out a Garden (3rd ed.).
Agden Hall; Agden	Cheshire; 53.3653°N 2.4295°W	—	c. 1856	For Thomas Sebastian Bazley. No further details known.
Glan Aber; Hough Green, Chester	Cheshire; 53.1770°N 2.9273°W	—	1857	For Enoch Robert Gibbon Salisbury. Plan and description is in How to Lay Out a Garden (3rd ed.). Shortly after the garden was laid out in 1857 both the house and grounds were enlarged and parts of the garden was re-arranged.
St Helens Cemetery; St Helens	Merseyside; 53.4673°N 2.7621°W		1858	For St Helens Burial Board.
Foxdale; Bunbury	Cheshire; 53.1183°N 2.6459°W	—	1860	For William Boulton Aspinall. Plan and description is in How to Lay Out a Garden (3rd ed.).
Birkdale Park; Birkdale	Merseyside; 53.640877°N 3.016938°W	—	1860	For Thomas Weld Blundell. Residential suburb containing villas set in their own grounds. Many elements survive. Designated as a conservation area in 2000.
Waterloo House; Runcorn	Cheshire; 53.3422°N 2.7376°W		1860	For Charles Hazlehurst, soap and alkali manufacturer of Hazlehurst & Sons. Now built up. Plan and description is in How to Lay Out a Garden (3rd ed.).
Anfield Cemetery; Liverpool	Merseyside; 53.439°N 2.958°W		1863	For Liverpool Burial Board. Still functioning as a cemetery. It is listed Grade II*. It is on the Heritage at Risk Register.
Pyrgo Park; Havering-atte-Bower	Greater London; 51.6195°N 0.1990°W		1863	For Joseph Bray. Now a public park.
Flaybrick Cemetery; Birkenhead	Merseyside; 53.400°N 3.065°W		1864	For Birkenhead's Improvement Commissioners. Still functioning as a cemetery. It is listed Grade II*.
Southport Cemetery; Southport	Merseyside; 53.6351°N 2.9978°W		1865	Still in use as a cemetery.
Grosvenor Park Chester	Cheshire; 53.1905°N 2.8815°W		1867	The land and the design of the park were paid for by Richard Grosvenor, 2nd Marquess of Westminster. Still open as a public park. It is listed Grade II.
Newsham Park; Liverpool	Merseyside; 53.419°N 2.940°W		1868	Designed for the Liverpool Improvement Committee. It continues in use as a public park and had been designated Grade II. The park is on the Heritage at Risk Register.
Hesketh Park; Southport	Merseyside; 53.6562°N 2.9880°W		1868	For the Southport Improvement Commissioners, possibly assisted by Joseph Paxton. It is still used a public park and is designated Grade II.
Stanley Park; Liverpool	Merseyside; 53.4353°N 2.9633°W		1870	For Liverpool Corporation. Designated Grade II.
Congleton Park; Congleton	Cheshire; 53.1666°N 2.2079°W		1871	Designed with William Blackshaw, the town surveyor, for the town council. It is still open as a public park, and has been designated at Grade II.
Massey Hall; Thelwall	Cheshire; 53.3770°N 2.5165°W	—	1874	Designed for Peter Rylands, MP for Warrington, and a member of a family running a wire-drawing works. The garden remains much as it was when Kemp designed it.
Saltwell Park; Gateshead	Tyne and Wear; 54.945°N 1.606°W		1876	Designed for Gateshead Council. It continues in use as a public park and is designated at Grade II.
Queen's Park, Crewe	Cheshire; 53.097°N 2.470°W		1888	Designed for Crewe Municipal Borough Council, following negotiations by Francis Webb with the London and North Western Railway to donate the land. The park is still in public use and is designated as Grade II.
Underscar; Applethwaite	Cumbria; 54.6202°N 3.1317°W		Unknown	Now the grounds of a hotel.
Shendish; Apsley	Hertfordshire; 51.7284°N 0.4711°W		Unknown	Now the grounds of a hotel. Kemp's design has more or less survived.
Dibbinsdale Bank; Allport Road; Bromborough	Merseyside; 53.3229°N 2.9812°W	—	Unknown	For George Whitley. No further details known.
Lead Works; Egerton Street; Chester	Cheshire; 53.1949°N 2.8842°W	—	Unknown	For Edward Walker. No further details known.
Daylesford House; Daylesford	Gloucestershire; 51.9358°N 1.6316°W		Unknown	Kemp designed the terrace garden.
Ledsham Hall; Ledsham	Cheshire; 53.2625°N 2.9645°W	—	Unknown	No further details known.
Residence (details unknown); Newton, Chester	Cheshire; 53.2102°N 2.8674°W	—	Unknown	For James Ball. No further details known.
Bank House; Runcorn	Cheshire; 53.3409°N 2.7347°W		Unknown	Designed for John Johnson, soap and alkali manufacturer of John & Thomas Johnson. Only a small portion still remains.
Knightshayes Court; Tiverton	Devon; 50.9260°N 3.4811°W		Unknown	Features designed by Kemp include the terraced gardens, an American Garden, and the kitchen garden.
Leighton Hall; Welshpool	Powys; 52.6338°N 3.1215°W		Unknown	For John Naylor.
