= Harry Verelst (cricketer) =

English cricketer

Harry William Verelst JP DL
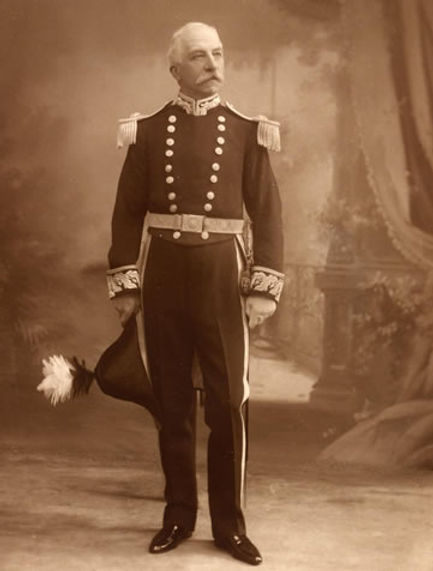
- Verelst in the uniform of deputy lieutenant for the West Riding of Yorkshire
- Born: 2 July 1846; Claughton, Birkenhead
- Died: 5 April 1918 (aged 71); Aston Hall, Yorkshire
- Spouse: Mary Wilson
- Children: 4
- Parent: Charles Verelst

Harry William Verelst (2 July 1846 – 5 April 1918) was an English amateur first-class cricketer, who played three games for Yorkshire County Cricket Club in 1868 and 1869. He also appeared in first-class games for the Marylebone Cricket Club (MCC) (1868), Gentlemen of the North (1867), North of the Thames (1868), Gentlemen of England (1870) and I Zingari (1878).

Verelst was a right-handed batsman, who scored 215 runs at 15.35, with a best of 78 for Gentlemen of the North against Gentlemen of the South. He scored three fifties and took two catches.

Born in Claughton, Birkenhead, Cheshire, England, he was the eldest son of Charles Verelst and his wife Anne Jane Willacy. He was a captain and honorary major in the Yorkshire Dragoons Yeomanry until he resigned his commission in April 1891. He was a justice of the peace for Derbyshire and JP and deputy lieutenant for the West Riding of Yorkshire.

Verelst died in April 1918 at his estate of Aston Hall, Yorkshire. His eldest son, Harry Wilson Verelst, was killed aged 26 at the Capture of Lesbœufs in 1916. Verelst's only surviving son, Rodney Wilson Verelst, inherited the estate and it was broken up and sold in 1928.
