= Applethwaite =

Village in Cumbria, England

Coordinates: 54.61°N 03.14°W

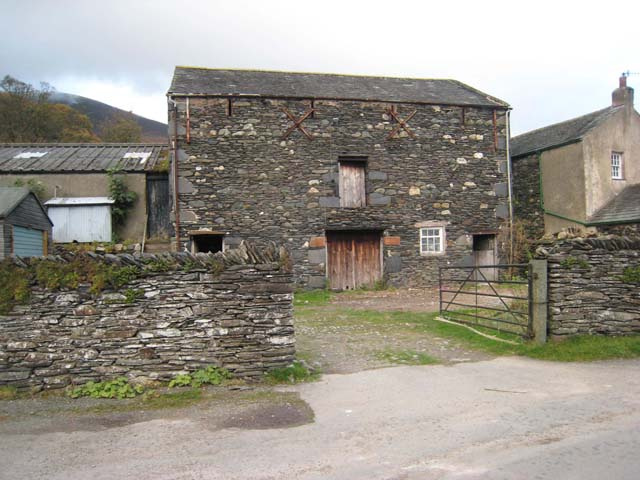
- Applethwaite

- Location in Allerdale, Cumbria Location within Cumbria
- OS grid reference: NY2625
- Civil parish: Underskiddaw
- Unitary authority: Cumberland
- Ceremonial county: Cumbria
- Region: North West
- Country: England
- Sovereign state: United Kingdom
- Post town: Keswick
- Postcode district: CA12
- Dialling code: 017687
- Police: Cumbria
- Fire: Cumbria
- Ambulance: North West
- UK Parliament: Penrith and Solway

Applethwaite is a village in the foothills of Skiddaw near Keswick in the English Lake District. It is in the county of Cumbria, and forms part of the civil parish of Underskiddaw, which has a population of 282. The name derives from it originally being the clearing in a forest with apples in it.

Applethwaite is mentioned in Alfred Wainwright's The Northern Fells guide book. The narrator/nursemaid Hester in "The Old Nurse’s Story" by Elizabeth Gaskell is from this village.

== The church ==
St Marys church in the village is plain with some stained glass windows. The other church here is St John the Evangelist.

== Location ==
Applethwaite is just off the A591, 1 mile (1.6 km) north of Keswick.

== See also ==
- Listed buildings in Underskiddaw
