= Claughton, Merseyside =

Village on the Wirral, England

Coordinates: 53.3947°N 3.0577°W

Claughton
- Village
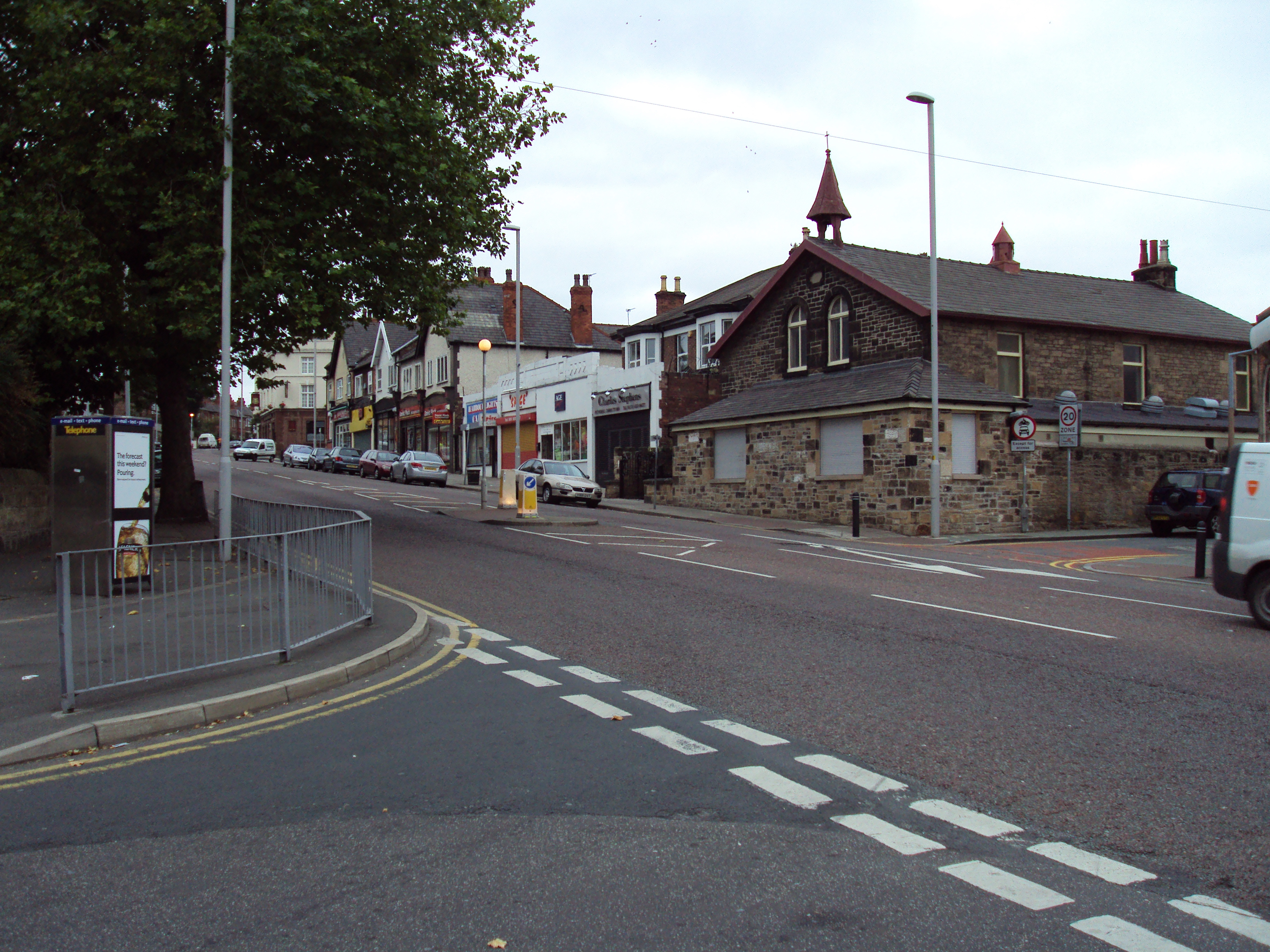
- The A5027 Upton Road seen from the junction with Shrewsbury Road. St Bede's Chapel and Community Centre is across the road.

- Location within Merseyside
- Population: 14,705 (2011 census Ward population)
- OS grid reference: SJ297891
  - London: 180 mi (290 km) SE
- Metropolitan borough: Wirral
- Metropolitan county: Merseyside
- Region: North West
- Country: England
- Sovereign state: United Kingdom
- Post town: BIRKENHEAD
- Postcode district: CH41
- Dialling code: 0151
- ISO 3166 code: GB-WRL
- Police: Merseyside
- Fire: Merseyside
- Ambulance: North West
- UK Parliament: Birkenhead

Claughton (/ˈklɔːtən/ KLAW-tən) is a village and suburb of Birkenhead, on the Wirral Peninsula, Merseyside, England. It is situated approximately 3 km (1.9 mi) to the west of Birkenhead town centre, adjacent to Birkenhead Park. Administratively, Claughton is a ward of the Metropolitan Borough of Wirral. Before local government reorganisation on 1 April 1974, it was part of the County Borough of Birkenhead, within the county of Cheshire.

At the 2001 census, the population of Claughton was 13,723. For the 2011 census the total population of Claughton Ward, which also included Noctorum, was 14,705.

== History ==
The name is of Viking origin, deriving from the Old Norse Klakkr-tun, meaning "hamlet on a hillock".

Claughton Manor House was built in about 1850 by local benefactor Sir William Jackson, with its gardens designed by Sir Joseph Paxton. It occupied a site between Egerton Road and Manor Hill until it was pulled down in the 1930s.

Recalling his childhood in Claughton in the 1860s, the artist Harry B. Neilson wrote:

"My father still wore half-Wellington top boots and the old fashioned stocks. The ladies wore poke bonnets, crinolines, Paisley shawls, and many-flounced, voluminous skirts, while young men of fashion affected peg-top trousers, little pork-pie hats with fluttering ribbons, and Dundreary whiskers. Policemen still wore top hats. Croquet was practically the only outdoor game played by ladies."

The Birkenhead Institute was founded in 1889 by a local philanthropist, George Atkin, who established the school as a commercial company with shareholders and directors. Originally situated in Whetstone Lane, Birkenhead, it was relocated in the 1970s to premises on Tollemache Road in Claughton. The school closed in 1994 and was subsequently demolished. Wilfred Owen, the World War I poet, attended the school at its original location. A residential road has been named after him on the Tollemache Road site.

=== Administrative history ===
Claughton with Grange was historically a township in the ancient parish of Bidston, which formed part of the Wirral Hundred of Cheshire. The township was administratively absorbed into Birkenhead in 1843 when it was added to the improvement commissioners' district which covered the town. After 1843 the township therefore had only limited administrative uses, primarily being used as an area for electing poor law guardians. All such townships were declared to be civil parishes in 1866, but with no change in their functions.

The Birkenhead improvement commissioners' district was enlarged and incorporated to become a municipal borough in 1877. All the civil parishes in the borough were united into a single parish in 1898.

The population of the township was recorded at 67 in 1801, 714 in 1851 and 733 in 1898.

On 1 April 1974, local government reorganisation in England and Wales resulted in most of the Wirral Peninsula, including Claughton, transfer from Cheshire to the new county of Merseyside.

== Geography ==
Claughton is in the north-eastern part of the Wirral Peninsula, approximately 4 km (2.5 mi) south-south-east of the Irish Sea at Wallasey, 8.5 km (5.3 mi) east-north-east of the Dee Estuary at Caldy and 3 km (1.9 mi) west of the River Mersey at Woodside. Claughton is situated on the eastern side of Bidston Hill, with the shops and college on the A5027 road at an elevation of 25–36 m (82–118 ft) above sea level.

== Governance ==
Claughton is within the parliamentary constituency of Birkenhead. The current Member of Parliament is Mick Whitley, a Labour representative. He has been the MP since 2019.

At local government level, the area is incorporated into the Claughton Ward of the Metropolitan Borough of Wirral, in the metropolitan county of Merseyside. It is represented on Wirral Metropolitan Borough Council by three councillors. The most recent local elections took place on 6 May 2021.

== Economy ==
The village has a large number of shops, as well as cafes, bakery, florist, post office, and local pubs such as the 'Claughton Hotel', the 'Heather Brow' and 'Houlihan's Variety Club'.

== Education ==
Claughton is the location of Birkenhead Sixth Form College, which was established by the local education authority in 1988.

== Transport ==
Claughton Village lies on the A5027 road, which continues on westbound to Saughall Massie and joins the A553 road towards Birkenhead.

Birkenhead Park railway station is located approximately 1.4 km (0.87 mi) to the east of Claughton. This station is on the Wirral Line of the Merseyrail network.

== Notable people ==
The artist Harry B. Neilson grew up in Claughton, living in a house in Forest Road called Airliewood which his father had built in 1863.

War artist Edgar Downs was born in Claughton in 1876, as was Cecil Arthur Lewis, the First World War fighter ace and BBC executive, in 1898.

=== Others ===
- Charles Alford, church minister, incumbent at Christ Church, Claughton
- John Blakeney, priest, curate of Christ Church, Claughton
- Gruffydd Evans, Baron Evans of Claughton, politician, educated in Birkenhead and lived in Claughton
- Cecil Holden, cricketer, died in Claughton
- Stephen Ladyman, Labour politician, educated in Claughton
- Charles Reed, architect, died in Claughton
- John Taylor, church minister, vicar of Christ Church, Claughton
- William Taylor, church minister, curate in Claughton
- Harry Verelst, cricketer, born in Claughton
- Frederick Smeeton Williams, church minister, worked in Claughton
- Arthur Willmer, cricketer, born in Claughton
- Charles Verelst, architect, from Claughton

== See also ==
- Listed buildings in Claughton, Merseyside

== Bibliography ==
- Mortimer, William Williams (1847). The History of the Hundred of Wirral. London: Whittaker & Co. pp305-306.
