= Underskiddaw =

Civil parish in Cumbria, England

Coordinates: 54.61°N 3.14°W

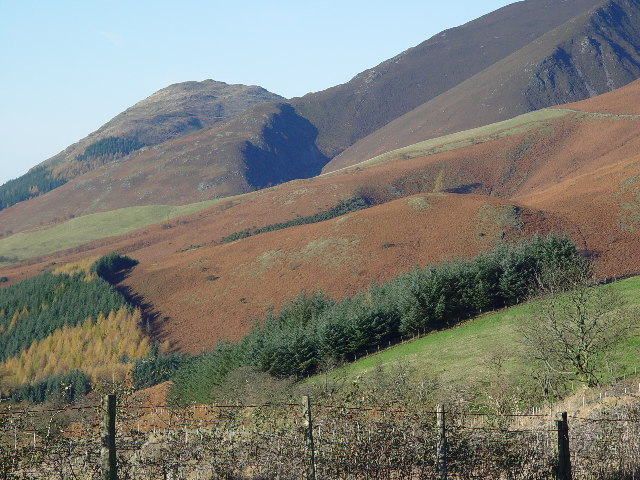
- Skiddaw Little Man

- Location in Allerdale, Cumbria Location within Cumbria
- Population: 264 (2011)
- OS grid reference: NY2625
- Civil parish: Underskiddaw
- Unitary authority: Cumberland
- Ceremonial county: Cumbria
- Region: North West
- Country: England
- Sovereign state: United Kingdom
- Post town: KESWICK
- Postcode district: CA12
- Dialling code: 01768
- Police: Cumbria
- Fire: Cumbria
- Ambulance: North West
- UK Parliament: Penrith and Solway

Underskiddaw is a civil parish in the Cumberland in the English county of Cumbria. The parish lies immediately to the north of the town of Keswick, and includes the southern and eastern flanks of Skiddaw as well as part of the valley of the rivers Greta and Derwent, and a small part of Bassenthwaite Lake. The parish includes the settlements of Applethwaite, Millbeck and Ormathwaite, all of which lie along the line where the southern slopes of Skiddaw meet the valley. A significant area of the parish is within the Skiddaw Group SSSI (Site of Special Scientific Interest) and, within that, Cumbria Wildlife Trust has the 1,200 sq mi (3,100 km^{2}) Skiddaw Forest nature reserve rewilding project.

The parish has a population of 282 in 122 households, reducing at the 2011 Census to a population of 264 in 128 households. It is within the Penrith and Solway constituency of the United Kingdom Parliament.

Millbeck Hall belonged to the Williamson family. Edward Williamson of Millbeck died before 1577 owing money to the German copper miners at Keswick and Caldbeck. There is a carved stone doorway lintel dated 1592 with the name of the owner, Nicholas Williamson. The inscription in Latin has been translated as "Whither? to live and die, or to die and live". In March 1595, a distant cousin, also called Nicholas Williamson visited Millbeck. He was arrested and taken to the Tower of London for his part in a conspiracy.

== See also ==
- Listed buildings in Underskiddaw
