= Charles Reed (architect) =

English architect

Charles Verelst
- Born: Charles Reed; 1814
- Died: 13 December 1859 (aged 45); Claughton, Birkenhead
- Resting place: Holy Cross Church, Woodchurch
- Occupation: Architect
- Spouse: Anne Jane Willacy (m. 1845; died 1903)
- Children: 5 (including Harry Verelst)
- Parent: Arthur Charles Verelst (illegitimate)
- Buildings: Shaw Hill; Halton Grange; Plas Rhianfa; Underscar Manor
- Projects: Claughton Park Estate

Charles Reed (later Charles Verelst) (1814 – 13 December 1859) was an English architect. He practised in Birkenhead, which was then in Cheshire. Most of Reed's early work is in the Italianate style, with later buildings in Gothic Revival.

Reed was an illegitimate son of Arthur Charles Verelst (1779–1843). He was brought up by an uncle. When his father's brother William Verelst (1784–1851) died, Reed inherited the estate at Aston Hall, Yorkshire on condition that he changed his surname to Verelst.

During the 1840s and 1850s he worked for Sir William Jackson in laying out a housing estate in Claughton, and designing villas within that development. Two roads in the estate, Charlesville and Reedville, are named after him. In 1852–54 he was president of the Liverpool Architectural Society. In addition to designing buildings locally, Reed also carried out works further afield, including in North Wales, the Lake District, and Lytham, Lancashire. He was a commissioner of Birkenhead for many years. He died in Claughton, Birkenhead.

== See also ==
- List of works by Charles Reed
