= Grade II listed buildings in Liverpool-L17 =

Liverpool is a city and port in Merseyside, England, which contains many listed buildings. A listed building is a structure designated by English Heritage of being of architectural and/or of historical importance and, as such, is included in the National Heritage List for England. There are three grades of listing, according to the degree of importance of the structure. Grade I includes those buildings that are of "exceptional interest, sometimes considered to be internationally important"; the buildings in Grade II* are "particularly important buildings of more than special interest"; and those in Grade II are "nationally important and of special interest". Very few buildings are included in Grade I — only 2.5% of the total. Grade II* buildings represent 5.5% of the total, while the great majority, 92%, are included in Grade II.

Liverpool contains more than 1,550 listed buildings, of which 28 are in Grade I, 109 in Grade II*, and the rest in Grade II. (Note: These figures are taken from a search in the National Heritage List for England in May 2013, and are subject to variation as further buildings are listed, grades are revised, or buildings are delisted.) This list contains the Grade II listed buildings in the L17 postal district of Liverpool. The district lies to the south of the city centre, and much of it developed in the 19th century as an area where the prosperous merchants and businessmen of the city built their mansions. Its centrepiece is Sefton Park, which is designated by English Heritage at Grade I in the Register of Historic Parks and Gardens. The park contains a number of buildings listed at Grade II, including the lodges and entrances, statues, shelters, a bandstand, drinking fountains, and grottos. The roads encircling the park, especially Mossley Hill Drive and Ullet Road, contain listed houses originally built for the merchants. Also in the district is Fulwood Park, a private estate developed from 1840, which also includes listed mansions. Other listed buildings in the district include a church, a bank, a bridge, and a public house.

Grade II listed buildings from other areas in the city can be found through the box on the right, along with the lists of the Grade I and Grade II* buildings in the city.

== Buildings ==
Name	Location	Photograph	Built	Notes
Entrance Gates	Aigburth Road; 53.37509°N 2.93708°W		c. 1870	This formed the entrance to Sefton Park from Aigburth Road, designed by Lewis Hornblower and Édouard André in Gothic style. In the centre is a screen containing the Liverpool coat of arms. This is flanked by granite piers, and three-bay arcades. On the top is a pavilion roof with iron cresting. On each side of the screen are two granite gate piers, with stone capitals and caps. The granite columns were removed from St George's Hall in the 1850s.
Gate piers, St Anne's Church	Aigburth Road; 53.36963°N 2.93032°W		1832	The gate piers were designed by Cunningham and Holme, who also designed the church. They are in two pairs, constructed in stone, and are in Neo-Norman style. They are octagonal, with features including arcading, corbels, and finials.
Sefton Park Library	Aigburth Road; 53.3786°N 2.9473°W		1911	This was the last of the branch libraries designed by Thomas Shelmerdine, and is in Tudor Revival style. The ground floor is in stone, partly roughcast, and the upper parts are timber-framed. It has large brick chimneystacks. The library was opened by Andrew Carnegie, and contains a plaque to commemorate this.
Barclays Bank	301 Aigburth Road, 2 Ashfield Road; 53.3733°N 2.9339°W		1902	This was designed by Willink and Thicknesse for the Bank of Liverpool. It is in red brick with stone dressings and has a slate roof. The bank is in two storeys with and attic, and has two bays facing each road, with a canted bay on the corner between them. Its features include large voussoirs above the ground floor windows, shaped gables, and an octagonal turret on the corner, with oculi and a copper cap.
—	34 Alexandra Drive; 53.3804°N 2.94973°W	—	1860s	The house, which was later extended and used for other purposes, is in cream, brown and yellow brick with dressings in sandstone and a slate roof. It is in Gothic Revival style, and has two storeys, attics and a basement, and a principal front of seven bays. There is a rich scheme of internal decoration, which has been retained.
Presbytery, St Clare's Church	Arundel Avenue; 53.3912°N 2.9366°W		1890	The presbytery was designed by Leonard Stokes, who also designed the church. It is in brick with a slate roof, and is attached to the northeast corner of the chancel. The building is in two storeys with casement windows, and is simply detailed.
Bark Hill; 53.3705°N 2.9196°W	Barkhill Road		Early 19th century	The house, which was later extended and became part of a college, is in stuccoed brick with slate roofs, two storeys and basements. The original house has five bays, with a service wing to the west of eight bays, to which an attic storey was later added, and a later three-bay wing to the east. The middle bay of the original house is a full-height bow, the ground floor forming an entrance portico with pilasters, an entablature, and a dentilled cornice. The block has a plinth with corner pilasters, a moulded architrave between the floors, an eaves band, a moulded cornice, and a parapet. Most of the windows are mullioned and transomed sashes.
Four entrance piers	Fulwood Park; 53.3744°N 2.9375°W		c. 1840	The gate piers stand at the entrance to Fulwood Park, They are in red sandstone, The outer two have a square plan, the other two are octagonal with a cornice and a cap. The gates are no longer present.
Lodge	1A Fulwood Park; 53.37446°N 2.93738°W		c. 1840	The lodge stands at the entrance to the private estate of Fulwood Park. It is built in sandstone, and has a stone slate roof. The entrance front is in three bays. The central bay projects forward under a gable and has two storeys. The lateral bays are in one storey, the left-hand bay containing a doorway. There are hood moulds over the doorway and the windows. To the southeast of the house is a garden gate enclosed in a stone ogee-headed arch flanked by columns, above which is a parapet with four trefoil openings.
—	3 Fulwood Park; 53.3736°N 2.9368°W		c. 1840	A stuccoed house with a slate roof, later converted into flats. It is in two storeys with an attic, and has a front of five irregular bays. The second and fourth bays project forward. At the top of the building is a frieze and a cornice. The windows are sashes, those in the upper floor with arcaded balconies. In the fourth bay is a Tuscan porch with a balcony.
—	4 Fulwood Park; 53.3729°N 2.9391°W		c. 1840	An asymmetrical stuccoed house with a slate roof. It has two storeys and a six-bay front, the fourth bay projecting forward with a canted bay window. The fifth and sixth bays form a bow window. In the ground floor the windows are casements, and in the upper floor they are sashes.
—	5A and 5B Fulwood Park; 53.3733°N 2.9373°W		c. 1840	This originated as a single house, later divided into two houses. It is stuccoed, in one and two storeys, and has a seven-bay front. At the top of the building is a cornice and a parapet. The windows are sashes. In the second bay is a recessed porch with an Ionic colonnade and a balustrade. The fourth bay projects forward under a pediment. In the sixth bay is a Doric porch.
Parklea	6 Fulwood Park; 53.3726°N 2.9394°W		c. 1840	A stuccoed house with a hipped slate roof. It has an L-shaped plan, with two storeys and a three-bay front, the central bay protruding forward. The windows in the ground floor are round-headed, those in the upper floor have architraves and balconies. There is a central entrance with a fanlight.
—	8 Fulwood Park; 53.3718°N 2.9403°W		c. 1840	A stuccoed house with a hipped slate roof. It has two storeys with four bays on the front and three on the sides. The end bay is recessed, and the windows are sashes. In the second bay is an entrance with a Doric porch with an architrave.
—	9 and 9A Fulwood Park; 53.3721°N 2.9387°W		c. 1840	This originated as a single house, later divided into two houses. The building is stuccoed with slate roofs. It is symmetrical, in two storeys, and has five bays. The second and fourth bays project forward, and the end bays are recessed. The windows are sashes with architraves. At the top of the building are a frieze, a cornice, and a parapet.
Osborne House	13 Fulwood Park; 53.3708°N 2.9402°W		c. 1840	A stuccoed house with a slate roof, it has two storeys and a five-bay front, the two end bays on each side projecting forward under a pediment. At the top of the building is an entablature. The entrance is in the second bay, and in the fifth bay is a long stair-window. The windows are sashes with architraves. On the side is a porch with Tuscan pilasters.
—	15 Fulwood Park; 53.3699°N 2.9413°W		c. 1840	A stuccoed house with a slate roof, it has two storeys and a five-bay front. In the fifth bay is a two-storey canted bay window. The windows are sashes with architraves. The third and fourth bays contain a four-bay porch with a colonnade.
—	17 and 17A Fulwood Park; 53.3696°N 2.9417°W		c. 1840	A stuccoed house with a slate roof, it has two storeys and a five-bay front. The first two bays have a one-bay forward projection, and the ground floor window in the fifth bay also projects. Above the ground floor is a cornice. At the top of the building is an entablature. The windows are sashes with architraves. The porch has a four-bay colonnade with a pediment.
—	19 Fulwood Park; 53.3692°N 2.9421°W		c. 1840	A stuccoed house with a slate roof. It has three storeys and a five-bay front. The first bay projects forward and contains a two-storey canted bay window. At the top of the house is a frieze, and a cornice. The windows are casements with architraves. There is also a six-bay colonnade, and a 20th-century extension.
—	21 Fulwood Park; 53.3688°N 2.9426°W		c. 1840	A stuccoed house with a slate roof. It has two storeys and a five-bay front, the first two bays being recessed. At the top of the building is a frieze, a cornice, and a panelled parapet. The windows are sashes with architraves. The porch has a four-bay colonnade.
—	23 and 25 Fulwood Park; 53.3681°N 2.9432°W		c. 1840	A pair of houses with two storeys, each house having a four-bay front. The first, third, sixth and eighth bays project forward under gables with undulating bargeboards. The windows are sashes. Both houses have Tudor arched entrances. No 23 has a canted porch with a plain parapet, and No 25 has a gabled porch.
Greenbank Lodge	Greenbank Drive; 53.38982°N 2.92940°W		1878	A lodge to Sefton Park designed by Lewis Hornblower and Édouard André. It is in red brick with stone dressings and a slate roof. The lodge has two storeys, the upper storey being half-timbered. There are three bays, the outer two bays projecting forward under gables with decorative bargeboards. The windows are mullioned and transomed, and there is an oriel window in the first bay. On the left side are two half-dormers.
Gateway	Hadassah Grove; 53.38039°N 2.94456°W	—	1840s	An entrance, later blocked, consisting of a segmental-headed stone arch. It incorporates paired pilasters and a cornice, and is gabled.
—	2 Hadassah Grove; 53.3809°N 2.9448°W		1840s (probable)	A brick house with stone dressings and a slate roof. It has two storeys and three bays, with pilasters between the bays. All the windows have wedge lintels and are sashes. At the top of the house is a cornice and a frieze. In the first bay is a single-storey canted bay window.
—	4 and 6 Hadassah Grove; 53.3808°N 2.9445°W		1840s (probable)	Two brick houses with stone dressings and slate roofs. They are in two storeys, and each house has three bays with angle pilasters. The windows have wedge lintels and are sashes. The central entrances, and the windows above them, have architraves and consoled cornices.
—	7 and 9 Hadassah Grove; 53.3812°N 2.9448°W		1840s (probable)	Two brick houses with slate roofs. They are in two storeys, and each house has three bays. All the windows have wedge lintels and most are sashes, while two are casements. Each central entrance has panelled pilasters, a frieze and a cornice.
—	8 and 10 Hadassah Grove; 53.3807°N 2.9444°W		1840s (probable)	Two brick houses with stone dressings and a hipped slate roof. They are in two storeys, and each house has three bays. Along the top of the house is a cornice and a frieze. The windows have wedge lintels and are sashes. Both houses have ground floor canted bay windows.
—	11 and 13 Hadassah Grove; 53.3811°N 2.9446°W		1840s (probable)	Two stuccoed houses with a slate roof, in two storeys and three bays. Along the top of the building is a cornice and a frieze. The windows are all sashes. Both houses have a canted bay window, and the entrances are flanked by pilasters.
—	14 Hadassah Grove; 53.3805°N 2.9446°W		1840s (probable)	A brick house with stone dressings and a slate roof. It has two storeys and three bays, with pilasters and dosserets between the bays. All the windows have wedge lintels and are sashes. At the top of the house is a cornice. The central round-headed doorway has a Doric doorcase with fluted columns, a reeded frieze, and a fanlight.
—	17 Hadassah Grove; 53.3808°N 2.9440°W		1840s (probable)	A brick house with stone dressings and a slate roof. It has two storeys, with an entrance front of three bays and two bays facing the street. The windows have wedge lintels and are sashes. On the front is a verandah, behind which is a doorway with an architrave and a consoled cornice. Attached to the house is a stone screen. This has a central entrance with flanking panelled pilasters and gabled finials.
—	19 Hadassah Grove; 53.3804°N 2.9444°W		1840s (probable)	A brick house with stone dressings and a slate roof. It has two storeys, with an entrance front of three bays and two bays facing the street. The windows have wedge lintels and are sashes. The entrance is round-headed with a Doric doorcase. There is an attached screen wall containing an entrance with pilasters and finials.
The Bridge	Ibbotsons Lane; 53.3817°N 2.9304°W	—	c. 1880	A brick house with stone dressings and a slate roof. It has two storeys with an attic, and an entrance front of three bays. On each side of the entrance is a rectangular bay window. The windows are mullioned and transomed. The entrance is buttressed, and above it is an oriel window. The gables contain timbering and pargeted panels.
Albert public house	Lark Lane; 53.3817°N 2.9449°W		1873	A public house built for the brewer Robert Cain. It is a stuccoed building with a slate roof, in two storeys and an attic. There are five bays on Lark Lane, four on Pelham Grove, and a canted bay between them. The main entrance is in the canted bay, above which is a diapered panel, and a gable inscribed with "THE ALBERT". Other features include an oriel window, and a canted two-storey bay window with a finial. Included in the designation are four lamp holders.
Gate	Lark Lane; 53.3826°N 2.9438°W		c. 1870	Four stone gate piers at an entrance to Sefton Park in Gothic style, probably designed by Lewis Hornblower and Édouard André. The piers are square in section, with foliated cornice s and pyramidal caps. The inner piers have lanterns, and the outer piers have fleurons.
—	63 Lark Lane; 53.3811°N 2.9462°W		1884	This originated as the Christ Church Institute, and was later converted into a restaurant. It is built in brick and timber framing, with a tiled roof. It has two storeys with an attic, and a three-bay front. The ground floor has a central window, with entrances in the lateral bays. The upper storey is jettied, with a clock above the central window. The attic is further jettied, and contains panels with stencilled decoration. The windows are casements.
Christ Church	Linnet Lane; 53.3848°N 2.9486°W		1867–71	The church was designed by Culshaw and Sumners in Decorated style. It is constructed in stone, with slate roofs. It consists of a nave with a clerestory, aisles, a chancel with a south vestry and a north tower with a broach spire. At the west end are diagonal corner porches. The nave has a hammerbeam roof.
Iron Bridge	Mossley Hill Drive; 53.38120°N 2.93160°W		c. 1870	A cast iron bridge caring the road over a steam and a ravine designed by Lewis Hornblower and Édouard André. Octagonal columns support lattice girders. At the ends are brick piers; they have stone cornices and ornamental iron lamps.
Gledhill	1 Mossley Hill Drive; 53.3843°N 2.9323°W	—	1881	A house designed by James Francis Doyle, built in red brick with sandstone dressings, some timber framing, and a tiled roof. It is asymmetrical in an irregularly-shaped L-plan, it has two storeys with attics, and an irregular arrangement of bays. The windows are mullioned and transomed. Features include very tall chimneys, gables with pargeted panels, an oriel window, dormers, a two-storey polygonal bay window, and an entrance with a four-centred arch.
—	2 Mossley Hill Drive; 53.3838°N 2.9321°W	—	1880s	A house in common brick with dressings in red brick and terracotta, and a tiled roof. It has two storeys with an attic, and a four-bay front. The first and fourth bays project forward, and have tile-hung gables. In the ground floor are stone cross windows, the windows in the upper floor are sashes, and there are dormers in the attic.
—	3 and 4 Mossley Hill Drive; 53.3833°N 2.9319°W	—	1880s	Two houses in common brick with red brick and stone dressings. They have a nine-bay front. The first bay projects forward and has a pyramidal roof with a finial, and the end bay contains a two-storey canted bay window. All the windows are sashes. Other features include pebbledashed gables, and dormers with pargeted gables.
—	5 Mossley Hill Drive; 53.3830°N 2.9316°W	—	1881	A brick house with stone dressings and a tiled roof. It has two storeys with an attic, and a three-bay front. Most of the windows are mullioned. The first bay has a timber-framed gable containing a six-light window. The central bay projects forward, it has a doorway with pilasters and an entablature, and a gable with terracotta diapering. The end bay is recessed, and has a two-storey canted bay window, and a gabled dormer.
Duffus	6 Mossley Hill Drive; 53.3825°N 2.9315°W	—	1880s	A house in common brick with red brick and stone dressings, and a tiled roof. It has two storeys with an attic, and a three-bay front. In the central bay is a canted bay window with a parapet containing terracotta panels. The windows in the ground floor are casements, those in the upper floor are sashes, and in the roof are dormers.
Bridge House	7 Mossley Hill Drive; 53.3821°N 2.9313°W	—	1870s	A house in common brick with dressings in red brick and stone, and a tiled roof. It has two storeys and an attic, and fronts with three and four bays. The windows have mullions. It elaborately decorated with features including terracotta panels, attic windows with tympana and pediments containing swags, and gables in a variety of shapes.
Railings and gate piers, St Michael's Church	St Michael's Church Road; 53.37666°N 2.95017°W		1815	The iron railings run between the road and the churchyard; they and the gates have spear heads. The gate piers and the piers at the ends of the railings are also in iron and are decorated with panels, and have crocketed finials.
Arnewood	4 St Michael's Church Road; 53.3767°N 2.9507°W	—	c. 1815	A stuccoed house with a slate roof, it has two storeys and a three-bay front. On the front are pilasters, and at the top is a frieze. In the first bay is a canted bay window. The other windows have architraves, and all are sashes. At the entrance is a Doric aediculae.
Vicarage	6 St Michael's Church Road; 53.3765°N 2.9510°W	—	Early 19th century	A stuccoed house with a slate roof, it has two storeys and a three-bay front. On the front are pilasters, and at the top is a frieze. In the ground floor are canted bay windows with a cornice and a pierced parapet. All the windows are sashes. The gate and stone piers are included in the listing.
Aigburth Lodge	Sefton Park; 53.3752°N 2.9366°W	—	1874	The lodge stands at the entrance to the park from Aigburth Road, and was designed by Lewis Hornblower and Édouard André. It is built in red brick with decoration in blue brick, stone and timbering. It has a steep slate roof, and an L-shaped plan with a timber-framed porch in the angle. There are two storeys, and its features include oriel windows, half-dormers with balconies, and gables with decorative bargeboards.
Bandstand	Sefton Park; 53.38229°N 2.93813°W		Late 19th century	The bandstand is in the middle of the lake. It is octagonal with a brick base, and is surrounded by iron railings. The bandstand consists of thin iron columns supporting a red-tiled pagoda roof. On top of the roof is a lantern and an elaborate weathervane.
Drinking Fountain	Sefton Park; 53.37561°N 2.93739°W		c. 1870	This fountain stands near the south end of the lake, and was designed by Lewis Hornblower and Édouard André. It is constructed in sandstone, and is in High Victorian Gothic style. The fountain has a square plan, and contains four bowls, and entwined dolphins under a canopy supported by marble columns.
Drinking Fountain	Sefton Park; 53.38300°N 2.93907°W		1932	This contains a copy of the figure of Anteros from the Shaftesbury Memorial Fountain in Piccadilly Circus, London, which was designed by Alfred Gilbert; it is signed A. B. Burton. It stands on an octagonal bronze base containing a continuous trough, above which are eight bowls and numerous water jets. The base is decorated in Art Nouveau style and depicts fish and baby mermaids.
Grotto (northeast)	Sefton Park; 53.38767°N 2.93762°W		c. 1870	The grotto is on the north side of the lake, and was probably designed by Lewis Hornblower and Édouard André. It is built in large blocks of stone. It consists of a chamber with three entrances, a central pier, and steps leading up to an opening in the roof.
Grotto (west)	Sefton Park; 53.37767°N 2.93860°W		c. 1870	The grotto is on the west side of the lake, and was probably designed by Lewis Hornblower and Édouard André. It is built in large blocks of stone in a naturalistic style.
Monument to Samuel Smith	Sefton Park; 53.38602°N 2.94530°W		1909	The monument consists of an obelisk designed by C. J. Allen as a memorial to the local M. P. Samuel Smith. It is constructed in granite, stands on a square plinth with an inscription in bronze, and contains panels containing sculpted figures.
Princes Lodge	Sefton Park; 53.38672°N 2.94792°W		1874	The lodge stands at the main entrance to the park, and was designed by Lewis Hornblower and Édouard André. It is in red brick and sandstone with half-timbering, and is in cottage orné style. The lodge is in two storeys, and has a T-shaped plan with a porch in the angle. To the left of the porch is a canted bay with mullioned and transomed windows. Facing Ullet Road is a canted bay window with a jettied first floor.
Shelter (east)	Sefton Park; 53.37865°N 2.93818°W	—	c. 1870	The shelter is on the east side of the lake, and was probably designed by Lewis Hornblower and Édouard André. It is wooden, standing on a brick base, and has a slate roof. Its plan is rectangular, and it has open sides containing arches with cinquefoil heads and trellis work.
Shelter (west)	Sefton Park; 53.37622°N 2.93839°W	—	c. 1870	The shelter is on the west side of the lake, and was probably designed by Lewis Hornblower and Édouard André. It is wooden, standing on a brick base, and has a slate roof. Its plan is rectangular, and it has open sides containing arches with cinquefoil heads and trellis work.
Statue of Peter Pan	Sefton Park; 53.38148°N 2.93567°W		1928	A replica of the Peter Pan statue in Kensington Gardens, designed by George Frampton. It is in bronze, and depicts Peter Pan standing astride a tree trunk decorated with images of fairies and small animals.
Statue of William Rathbone	Sefton Park; 53.38001°N 2.93692°W		1877	The marble statue is of William Rathbone V who died in 1868. It was begun by J. H. Foyle, and completed by Thomas Brock. The statue stands on granite steps and a plinth. Originally there were three reliefs by Brock representing education, industry and charity, but these have been removed.
The Dell	Sefton Park; 53.3812°N 2.9323°W		c. 1870	A series of four pools linked by a stream, bounded by sandstone rocks and slabs. Some of the slabs are overhanging to create waterfalls. The stonework was designed by M. Combaz.
Tunnel	Sefton Park; 53.37935°N 2.93926°W		c. 1870	A short tunnel taking one footpath under another. It was probably designed by Lewis Hornblower and Édouard André. The tunnel is constructed in large blocks of stone, and has a naturalistic style.
Ullet Road entrance	Sefton Park; 53.38688°N 2.94766°W		1875	Standing at the main entrance to the park and designed by Thomas Shelmerdine, this consists of a screen flanked by gate piers, all in stone. The base is buttressed with arched recesses. It supports three columns, the central one being slim and in sandstone, the lateral two being broader, and in granite. These carry a slate roof with iron cresting. The four piers are in granite with conical caps, three of them carrying lamps.
—	3 Southwood Road, 2 Alpass Road; 53.3769°N 2.9511°W	—	Early 19th century	A stuccoed house with a hipped slate roof. It is in two storeys, and has fronts of three and four bays. All the windows are sashes with architraves. The entrance is in an enclosed porch with panelled pilasters, a frieze, a cornice, and a gable.
—	16 and 18 Southwood Road; 53.3771°N 2.9514°W	—	1830s	A pair of stuccoed houses with a slate roof. They have two storeys, and each house is in two bays. The outer bays have canted bay windows, between which is a five-bay iron loggia. At the top of the building is a frieze and a cornice. The windows are casements.
—	20 Southwood Road; 53.3770°N 2.9515°W		Early 19th century	A stuccoed house with a slate roof, it is in two storeys, and has a three-bay front. All the windows have architraves; in the ground floor they are casements, and in the upper floor they are sashes. The entrance is on the side.
Norwegian Fishermans' Church	22 Southwood Road; 53.3764°N 2.9522°W	—	Early 19th century	This originated as a house. It is stuccoed with a slate roof, and has two storeys and an attic. The building has fronts of three and four bays, the end bays projecting forward under gables. The windows are sashes with Tudor arched heads.
—	24 Southwood Road; 53.3764°N 2.9522°W		Early 19th century	A stuccoed house with a hipped slate roof. It is in two storeys, and has a three-bay front, the central bay projecting forward. At the angles are pilasters. To the left of the central porch is a rectangular bay window, and above the porch is a window with an architrave, a frieze, and a cornice. All the windows are sashes.
Church Hall, St Agnes' Church	Ullet Road; 53.3899°N 2.9400°W		1887 (probable)	The hall stands behind the church. It is in brick with a tiled roof, and was designed by Norman Shaw in Gothic style. It is a simple building, linked to the church by a passage, and contains lean-to aisles and a clerestory.
Wall and gates, Ullet Road Unitarian Church	Ullet Road; 53.38954°N 2.93776°W		c. 1898	The walls extend from Cheltenham Avenue, along Ullet Road, and into York Avenue. They were designed by Thomas Worthington, and are in brick, with a stone plinth, coping, and dressings. They contain three sets of wrought iron gates.
Ullet Grange	36 Ullet Road; 53.3870°N 2.9467°W		1870s	A brick house with stone dressings and a slate roof. It is in three storeys, and has an entrance front of four bays. Two of the bays project forward, and have gables with timbering and bargeboards. The garden front has three bays, a canted bay window with a balcony above, and half-dormers. Most of the windows are mullioned and transomed.
—	38 Ullet Road; 53.3872°N 2.9464°W		1860s	A stuccoed house with a slate roof. It has four storeys, and a three-bay front. The windows and surrounds vary, some with architraves and pediments, and one containing seven round-headed lights. At the centre of the rear is a two-storey bow window. The entrance porch has a Doric-style colonnade with a balustraded balcony above.
—	40 Ullet Road; 53.3874°N 2.9462°W		1860s	A stuccoed house with a slate roof. It has three storeys, and a five-bay front, the central bay being recessed. The windows are sashes with architraves. At the top of the house is a frieze and a cornice. In the first bay is a bay window. In the third bay is a five-bay blind arcade with archivolts and keystones, above which is a Venetian window with busts in roundels, and a pediment.
—	42 Ullet Road; 53.3876°N 2.9459°W		1860s	A stuccoed house with a slate roof. It has three storeys, and a five-bay front. The windows are sashes and have architraves. In the middle bay is a five-bay blind arcade with archivolts and keystones. At the top of the house is a frieze and a cornice. The entrance is in the fourth bay, and has a rusticated surround.
Restaurant	44 Ullet Road; 53.3877°N 2.9455°W		1870s	Originally a house, later converted into a restaurant, it is built in common brick with dressings in red brick and stone, and has a slate roof. It has three storeys and a basement, and a front of three bays. Most of the windows are mullioned and transomed. Features include a tower with an octagonal turret surmounted by a conical roof, a Tudor arched entrance, gables with timbering and decorative bargeboards, and, at the rear, a balustraded terrace.
Gates and gate piers	44 Ullet Road; 53.38796°N 2.94585°W	—	1870s	The gates are wooden, between four stone gate piers. The piers have cornices decorated with Tudor flowers. They are castellated and have ogival caps with fish-scale pattern, crockets and fleurons.
Sefton Court Mansions	50 Ullet Road; 53.3884°N 2.9433°W		1860s	A stuccoed house with a hipped slate roof. It is mainly in three storeys with a basement, and has fronts of four and three bays. In the first bay is a canted bay window. The windows are sashes, those in the first floor with balustraded balconies. The porch has Doric columns, and above it is a pedimented window. The interior was remodelled in 1912, with decoration by the Bromsgrove Guild.
Holt House	54 Ullet Road; 53.3887°N 2.9400°W		c. 1870	The house was built for Robert Durning Holt, ship owner and first Lord Mayor of Liverpool. It is in red brick with sandstone dressings, and has a Welsh slate roof. The house has basically an L-shaped plan, and is in two storeys with a basement and attics. The entrance porch has Tuscan columns carrying an entablature and a frieze. The windows are sashes. Other features include canted bay windows, a Diocletian window and, at the top of the house, a parapet and a domed lantern. The attached garden walls are included in the listing.
Wall and gate piers, Holt House	54 Ullet Road; 53.38911°N 2.94041°W		c. 1879	The wall and gate piers are in sandstone. The wall extends along Ullet Road and around the garden of Holt House. There are two pairs of gate piers, all of which are panelled with pyramidal caps.
Kelton	Woodlands Road; 53.3744°N 2.9260°W		Early 19th century	A stuccoed house with a hipped slate roof. It has two storeys, and a three-bay front, the central bay projecting forward. At the top of the house is a frieze and a cornice. Other than one casement window, all the windows are sashes. The porch is in Ionic style, with paired columns. There have been later extensions.

== See also ==
- Architecture of Liverpool

== References and notes ==
Notes

Citations

Sources

- Pollard, Richard; Pevsner, Nikolaus (2006), Lancashire: Liverpool and the South-West, The Buildings of England, New Haven and London: Yale University Press, ISBN 0-300-10910-5
