= Grand Entrance to Birkenhead Park =

Coordinates: 53.39433°N 3.03304°W

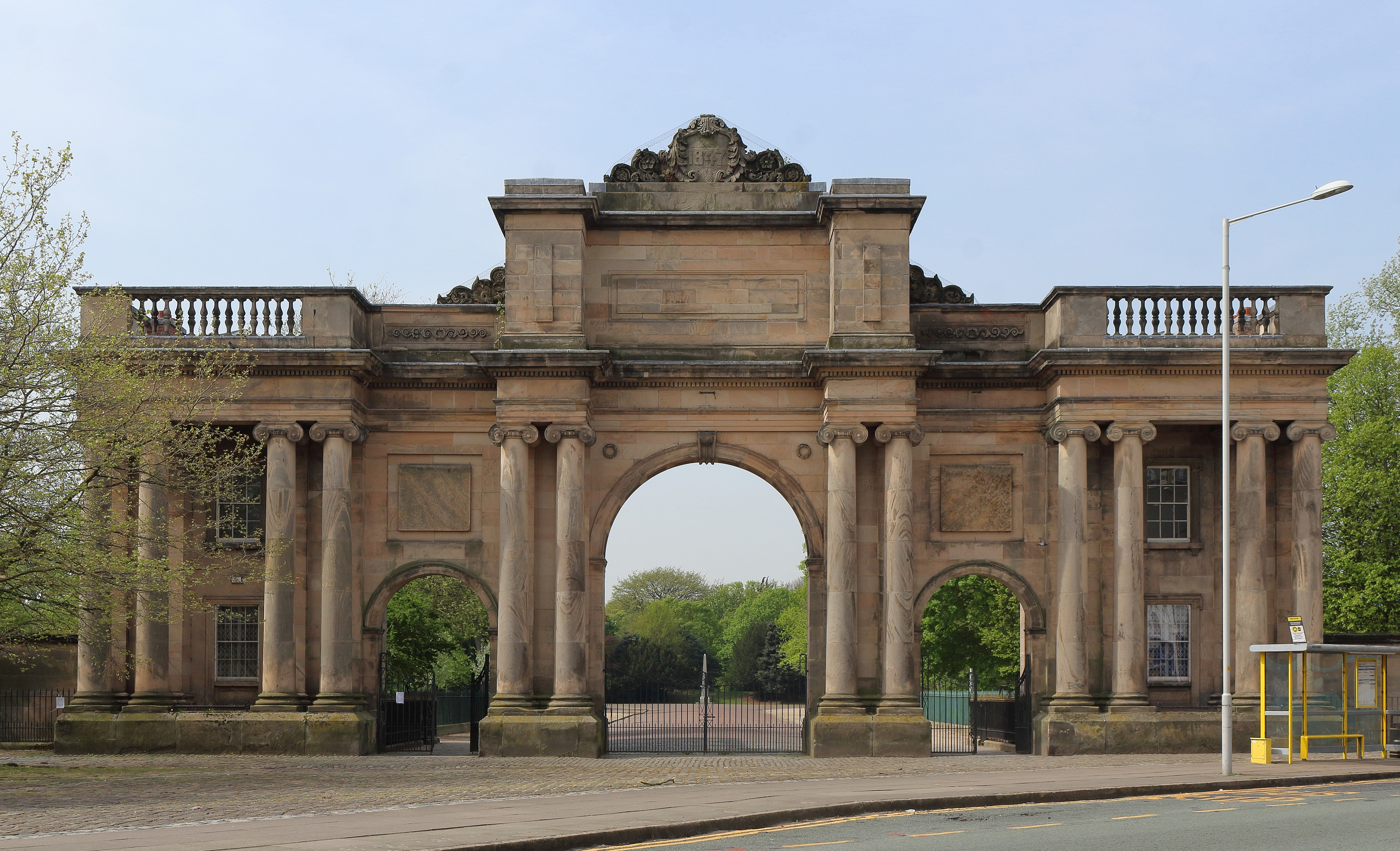
Grand Entrance to Birkenhead Park

The Grand Entrance to Birkenhead Park is at the northeast entrance to Birkenhead Park in Birkenhead, Wirral, Merseyside, England. It consists of three arches flanked by lodges and is in Ionic style. The entrance was designed by Lewis Hornblower, with amendments by Joseph Paxton, the designer of the park. The park, and its entrance, were opened in 1847. The Grand Entrance is recorded in the National Heritage List for England as a designated Grade II* listed building.

== History ==
Birkenhead Park was the first park in the world to be developed from public funds. It was designed by Joseph Paxton and its construction was supervised by Edward Kemp. Paxton appointed Lewis Hornblower to design the Grand Entrance. His plans were accepted by the Road and Improvement Committee in May 1845, but Paxton was not happy with them and made changes. The Grand Entrance was built by John and William Walker of Birkenhead between 1845 and 1847. The park, with its Grand Entrance, was opened on 5 April 1847 by Lord Morpeth, on the same day that Birkenhead Docks were opened.

== Description ==
The Grand Entrance is built in ashlar stone, and is in Ionic style. It consists of three arches flanked by a pair of lodges. The central arch is the largest, and contains a carriageway, and on either side there are smaller arches for pedestrians. The whole structure is about 19 metres (62 ft) high. The central arch is flanked by pairs of unfluted columns, and above it is a decorative attic containing the arms of the town and the date. The lodges are identical, in two storeys, and with three bays separated by pilasters. They have sash windows, and at the tops there are balustraded parapets.

== Appraisal ==
The Grand Entrance was designated as a Grade II* listed building on 29 June 1950. Grade II* is the middle of the three grades and is granted to "particularly important buildings of more than special interest". Hartwell and colleagues comment in the Buildings of England series that it is "grand indeed". The park itself is designated at Grade I in the Register of Historic Parks and Gardens. It influenced the design of Central Park in New York, which opened in 1858.

== See also ==
- Grade II* listed buildings in Merseyside
- Listed buildings in Birkenhead
