= Birkenhead Park =

Public park in Birkenhead, Wirral, England

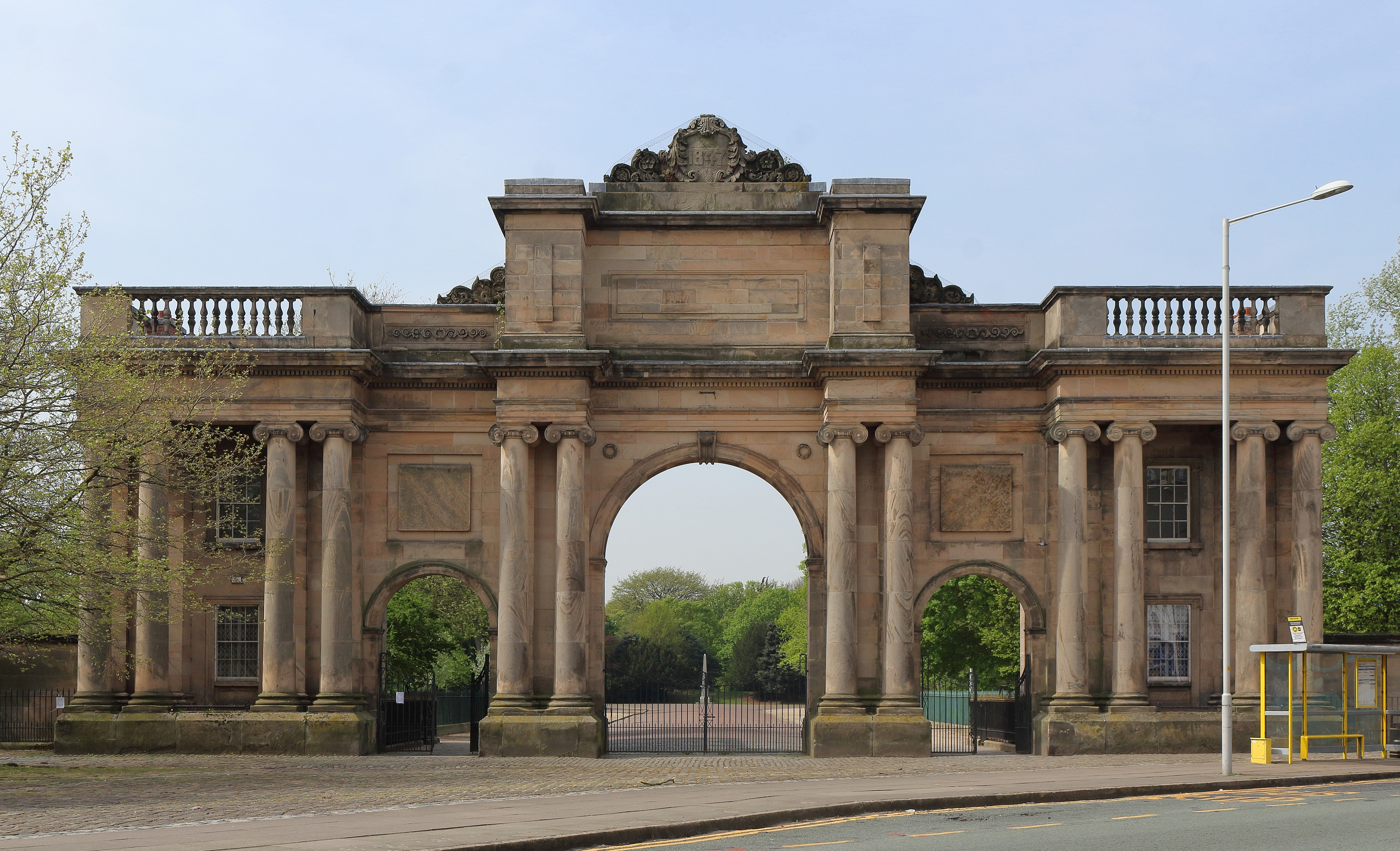
- Grand Entrance to Birkenhead Park
- Interactive map of Birkenhead Park
- Type: Public park
- Location: Birkenhead, Merseyside, England.
- Coordinates: 53.393°N 3.041°W
- Created: 5 April 1847
- Operator: Wirral Metropolitan Borough Council
- Status: Open all year
- Website: https://birkenhead-park.org.uk/

Birkenhead Park is a major public park located in the centre of Birkenhead, Merseyside, England. It was designed by Joseph Paxton and opened on 5 April 1847.

Birkenhead park was designated a conservation area in 1977 and declared a Grade I listed landscape by English Heritage in 1995. In 2023 the park was placed on the UK government's "tentative list" of applications for UNESCO World Heritage Site status. The park influenced the design of Central Park in New York and Sefton Park in Liverpool.

The park contains many listed buildings. The Grand Entrance was designed by Lewis Hornblower and is at the northeast corner; it consists of three arches flanked by lodges and is in Ionic style. The Swiss Bridge, a pedestrian span of stringer construction, is unique as being the only covered bridge of traditional wooden construction in the United Kingdom. There is also a Pavilion called the Roman Boathouse standing by the lake in the park, the upper storey of which was originally intended to be a bandstand. There are many historic listed lodges of various designs within the grounds of the park.

The park has a modern visitor centre, café, children's play area, woodland walks and various sporting facilities and clubs.

== History ==
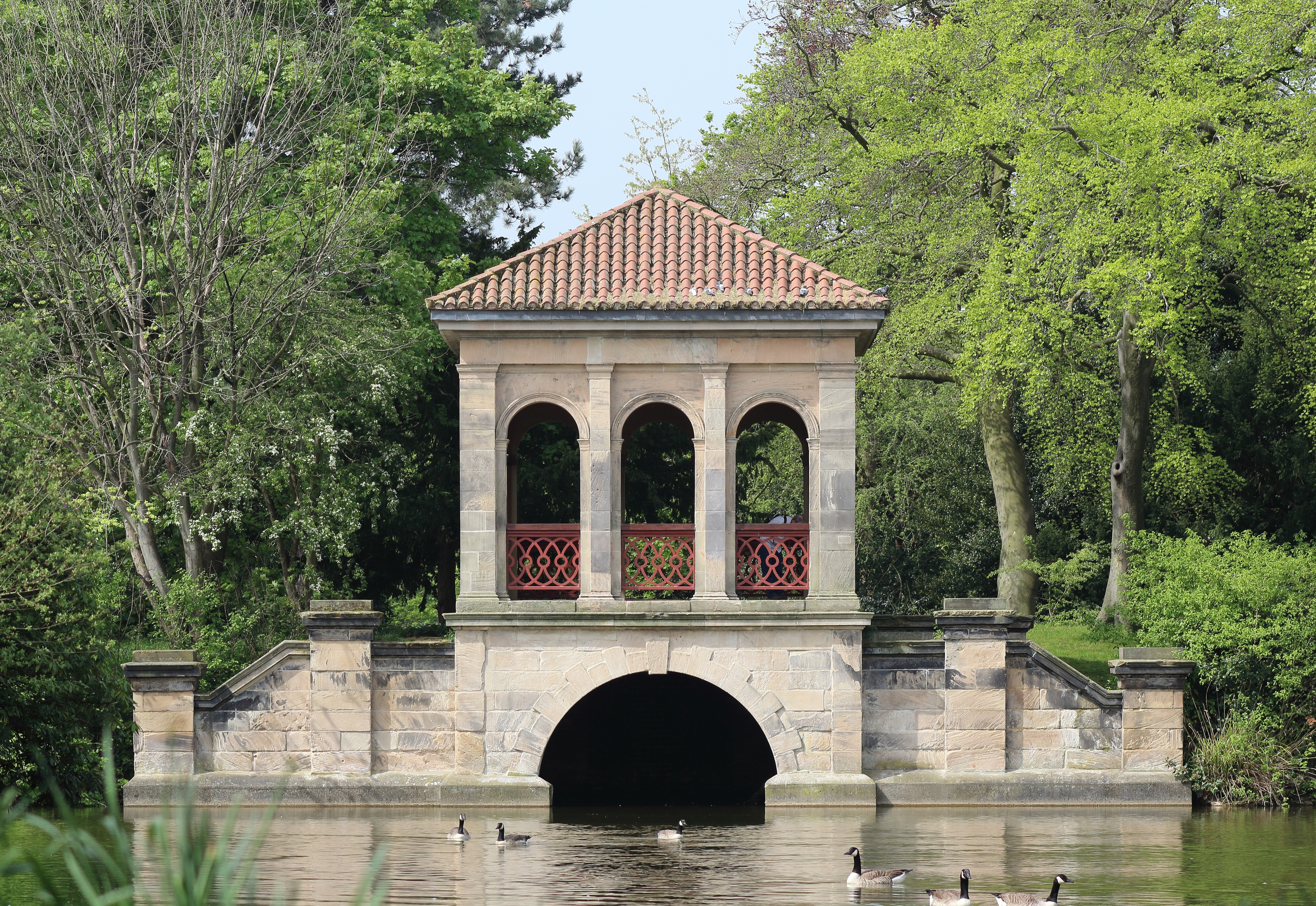
Roman Pavilion and Boathouse

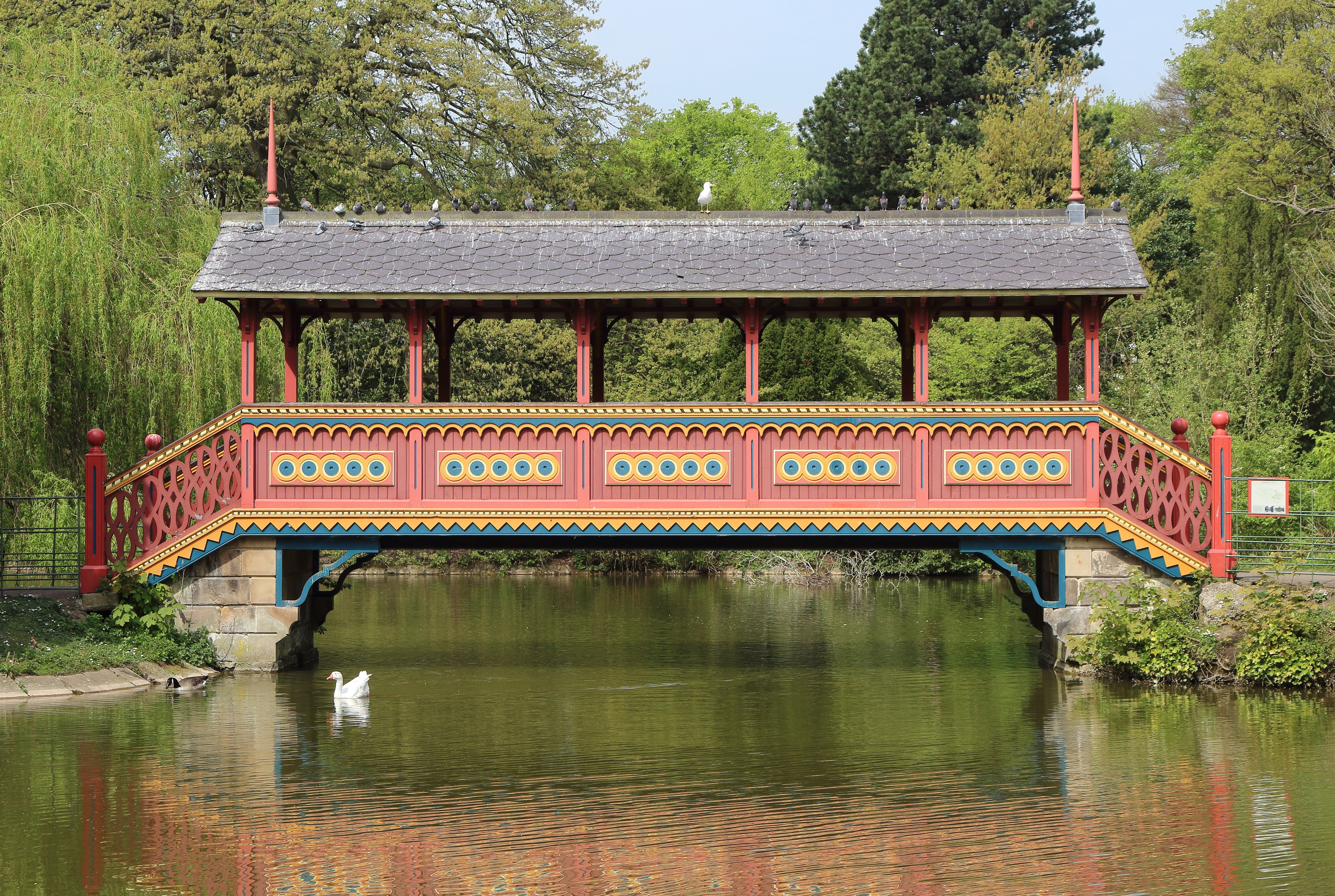
The Swiss Bridge over the lake.

In 1841 an improvement commission within Birkenhead's local government proposed the idea of a municipal park. A local act of Parliament, the Birkenhead Extension Act 1843 (6 & 7 Vict. c. xiii), allowed it to use public money to buy 226 acres (91 ha) of marshy grazing land on the western edge of Birkenhead.

And it be enacted, That the said Commissioners shall appropriate, for the Recreation of the Inhabitants within the Limits of this Act, such Parts as they may think proper of the Lands which they are hereby authorized to purchase, not being less than Seventy Statute Acres, and shall lay out, fence, and plant the same as a Park, and form Roads therein, with suitable Buildings and other Conveniences, and maintain and keep the whole in good Order and Repair; and it shall be lawful for the said Commissioners to appoint such Officers as may be necessary for maintaining the said Park, and preventing Nuisances or Disorder therein, and to pay to such Officers such Salaries as to them may seem fit. — Section 10 of the Birkenhead Extension Act 1843 (6 & 7 Vict. c. xiii)

Plots of land on the edge of the proposed park were then sold off in order to finance its construction. It is generally acknowledged as one of the earliest publicly funded civic parks in the world, following the opening of Peel Park in Salford on 22 August 1846 (Peel Park, Salford). The park plan was designed by Joseph Paxton and the building was supervised by Edward Kemp because both had previously worked on redesigning the gardens at Chatsworth House. Entrances, gateways, lodges, and other structures were designed for the park by Lewis Hornblower and John Robertson. Meanwhile, high-class residential accommodation was being built both around the park and in other areas, such as Clifton Park, the layout and buildings designed by Walter Scott and Charles Reed. Although some large houses and private villas were initially built by local merchants and wealthier business people, the Long Depression in the latter 19th century meant many plots remained undeveloped well into early 20th century.

The park took five years to build and was officially opened on 5 April 1847 by Lord Morpeth, an estimated 10,000 people attended on the day. The park had an informal style rather than a structured neatly arranged urban garden. Several miles of drainage pipes were laid to remove the water from the marshy land. During construction, hundreds of tonnes of stone and earth were moved to create well-drained terraces, hills, rockeries and lakes. It also led to the diversion of Old Bidston Road and the loss of a direct route between Claughton and Woodside. Paxton planted trees and shrubs at various places so visitors would enjoy the surprise of unexpected views or hidden features as they wandered through the park. Buildings included the Swiss Bridge, Boathouse, Norman Lodges, Gothic Lodge, Castellated Lodge and Italian Lodge. The Grade II* listed Grand Entrance, which embodies many aspects of a Triumphal arch with Ionic features, was designed by Lewis Hornblower, with amendments by Paxton.

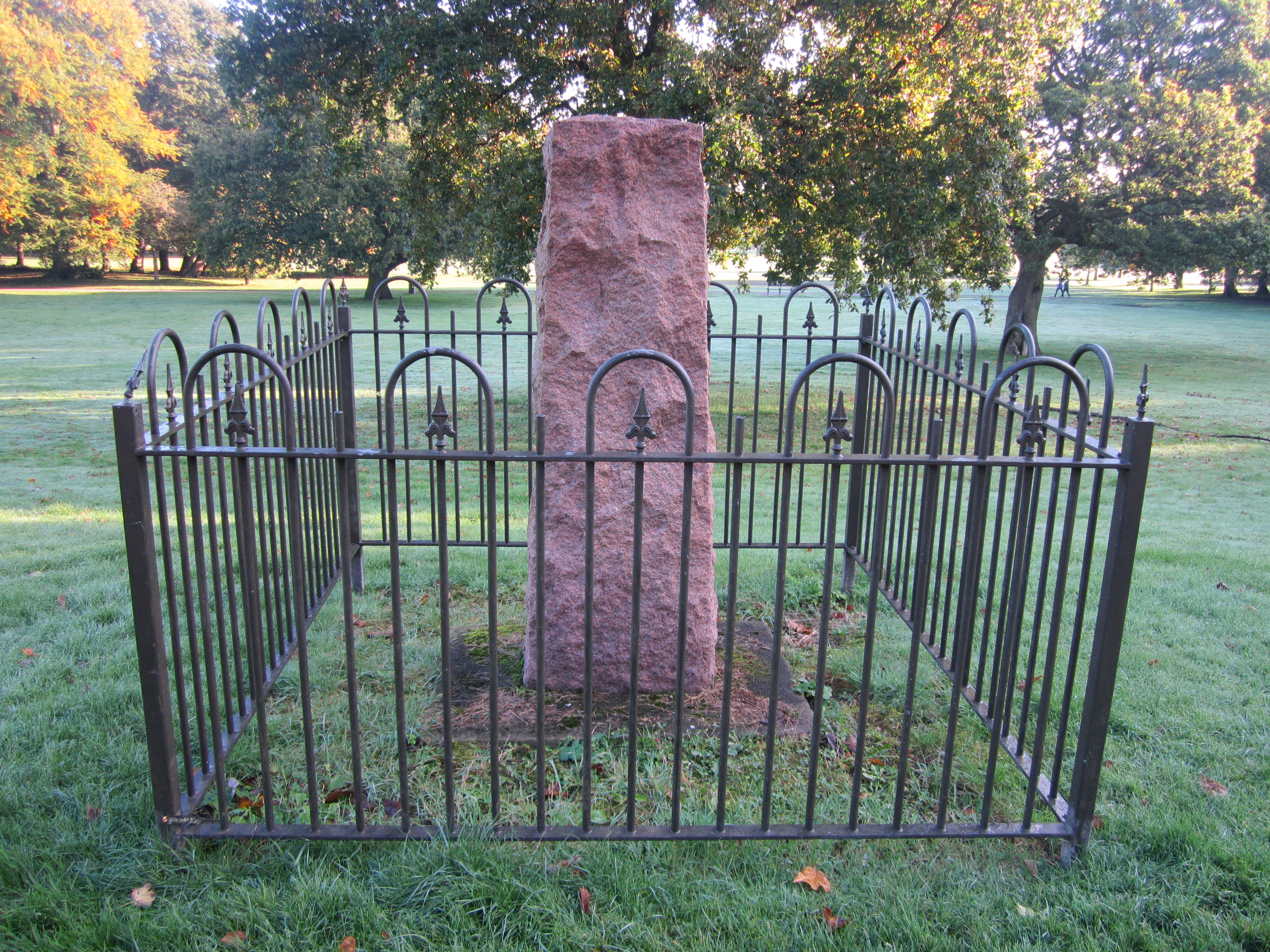
Eisteddfod stone within the Park.

During the First World War, part of the park was used as a training ground by the 3rd Battalion of the Cheshire Regiment. Recruits stayed at the Birkenhead Barracks on Grange Road West. Conscientious objectors were sent to the 3rd Cheshires because the battalion had a tough reputation. The family of a local trade unionist and "conchie", George Beardsworth, watched as he was repeatedly beaten and thrown over an obstacle course in the park. Although his treatment at Birkenhead led to questions in Parliament and a court case against the officers and men involved, no one was ever censured or prosecuted. In 1917 the National Eisteddfod of Wales ("The Eisteddfod of the Black Chair"), which was attended by Prime Minister David Lloyd George, was held within the park. The park had already paid host to the event in 1878 and 1879.

During the Second World War the area was damaged by bombs and a Spitfire made a crash landing in the park.

The park was designated a conservation area in 1977 and declared a Grade I listed landscape by English Heritage in 1995. In 2023 the park was placed on the UK government's "tentative list" of applications for UNESCO World Heritage Site status.

The park became run down and neglected towards the end of the 20th century. Beginning in the late 2000s, it has undergone major restoration work. A purpose-built visitors centre has been installed and work done to restore its original buildings and bridges as well as tidy up the lakes and parklands, and unblock the drainage system. The park underwent a five-year £11.5 million renovation completed in 2007, funded jointly by the Heritage Lottery Fund, Wirral Waterfront SRB, Wirral Council, and the European Union via the Objective One programme. All of the paths have been improved, trees and shrubs have been planted, the lakes have been emptied, cleaned and reshaped and most of the original features have been restored to their former Victorian glory.

== Influence on other parks ==
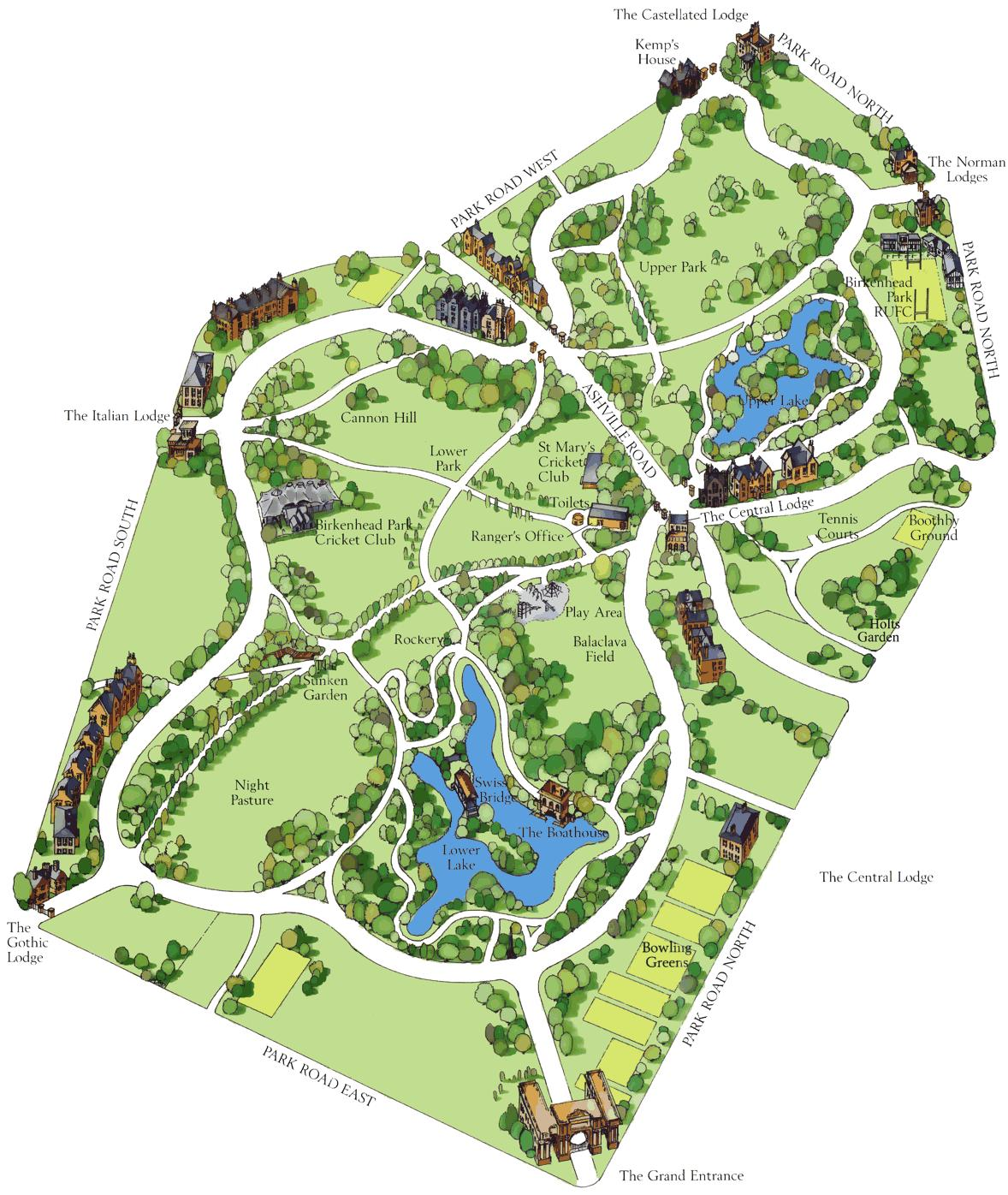
Map of Birkenhead Park

Birkenhead park was one of the earliest parks to be established at public expense in the United Kingdom. Prior to Birkenhead parks had been created by private individuals or private organisations and access was held privately, although it could be given to the public. Birkenhead park was influential on the design of public parks both in the UK and internationally and it is considered a landmark in the history of public parks.

In 1850, American landscape architect Frederick Law Olmsted arrived by ship in Liverpool. During his stay in Northwest England, he paid a visit to Birkenhead Park along with several other public gardens. He noted Birkenhead was "a model town" which was built "all in accordance with the advanced science, taste, and enterprising spirit that are supposed to distinguish the nineteenth century". In 1858, he and Calvert Vaux won the competition to design a new park, Central Park, for the rapidly growing city of New York.

Olmsted, who was influenced by the park, was greatly impressed by Paxton's designs. In his book Walks and Talks of an American Farmer in England, he wrote about its social value as an aesthetic form:

five minutes of admiration, and a few more spent studying the manner in which art had been employed to obtain from nature so much beauty, and I was ready to admit that in democratic America there was nothing to be thought of as comparable with this People's Garden.

Olmsted also commented on the "perfection" of the park's gardening:

I cannot undertake to describe the effect of so much taste and skill as had evidently been employed; I will only tell you, that we passed by winding paths, over acres and acres, with a constant varying surface, where on all sides were growing every variety of shrubs and flowers, with more than natural grace, all set in borders of greenest, closest turf, and all kept with consummate neatness.

Birkenhead Park was used as a template for the creation of Sefton Park, which opened in Liverpool in 1872.

== Points of interest ==
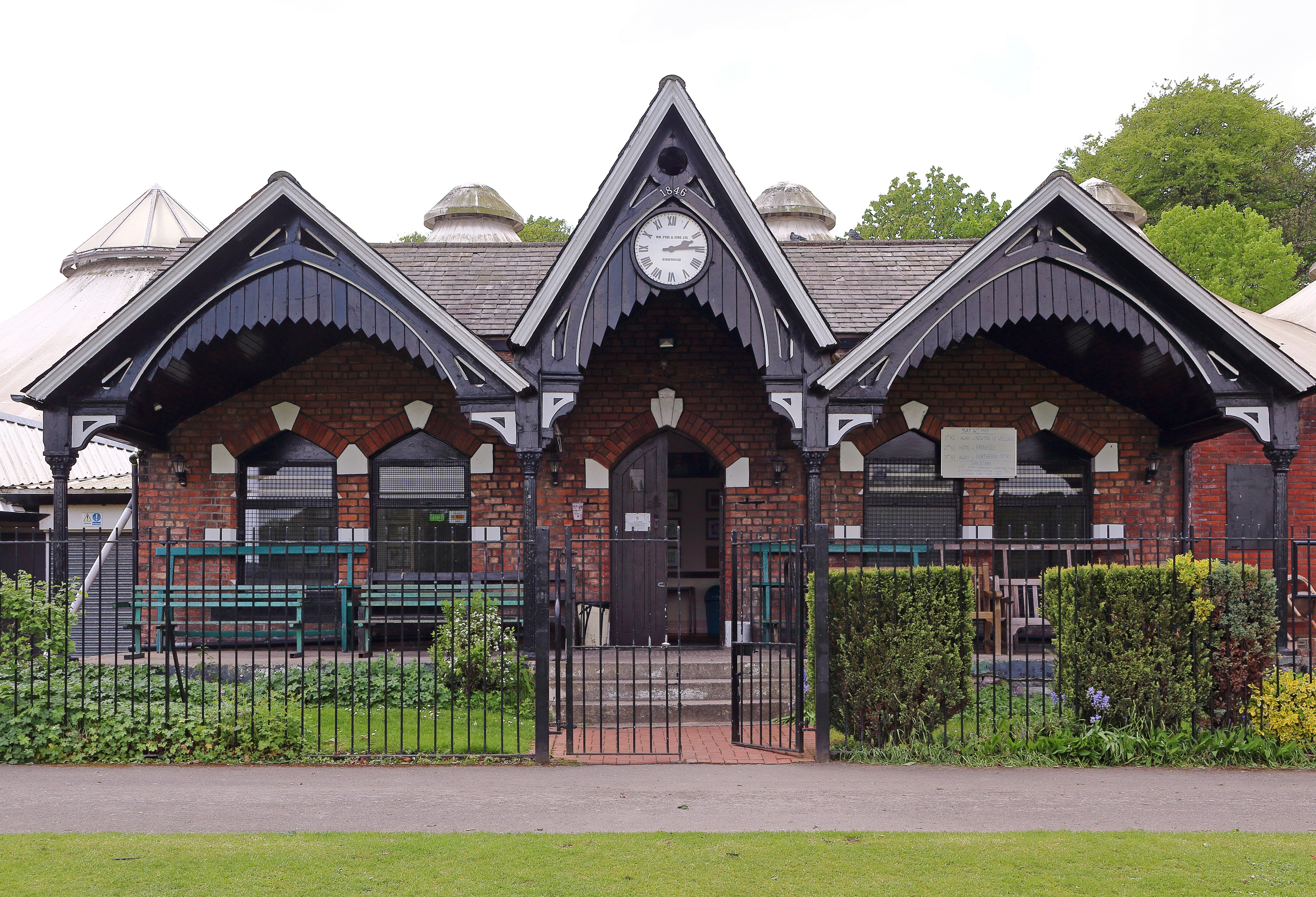
The gabled cricket pavilion

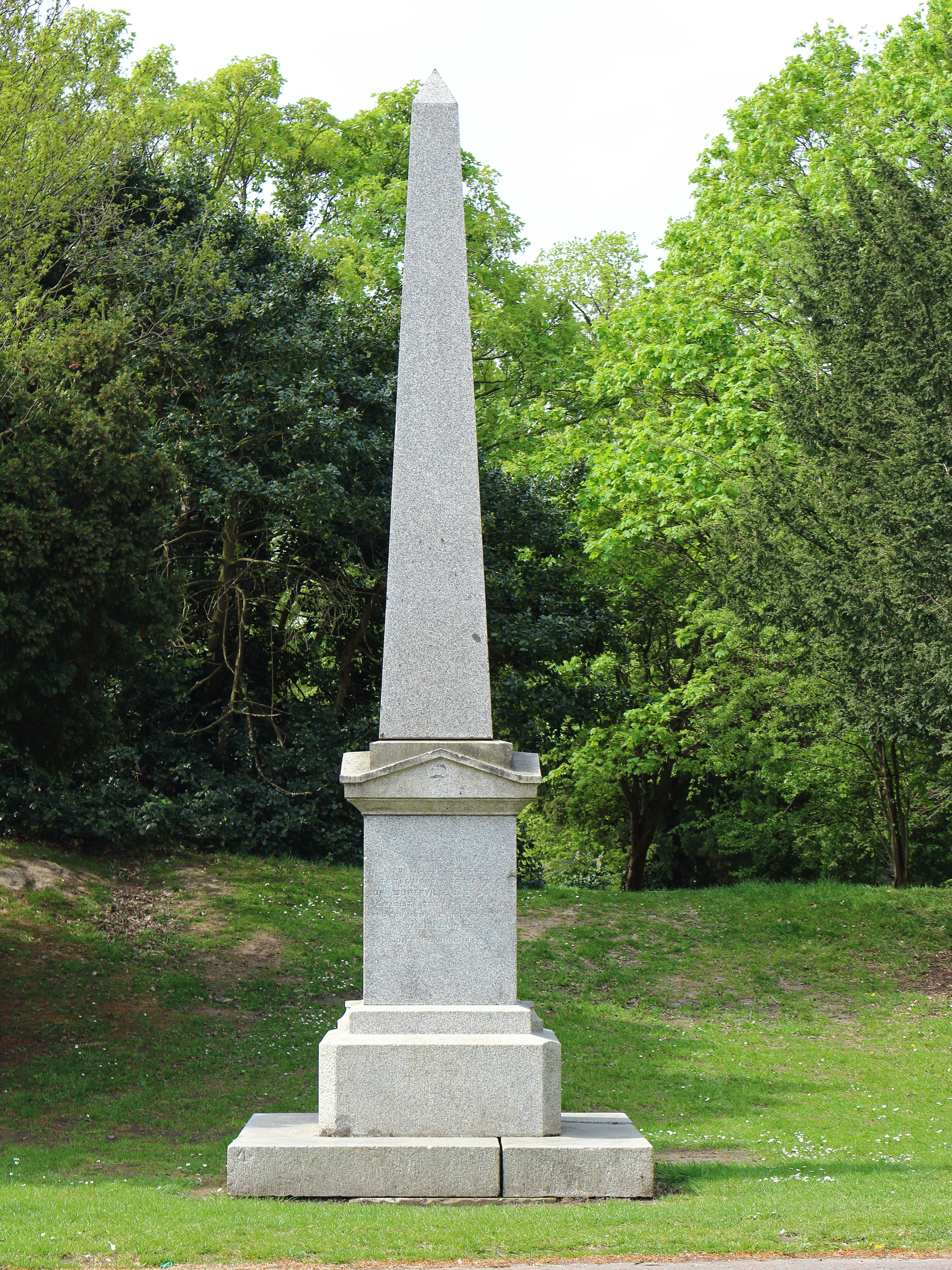
Jackson Memorial drinking fountain

The Grand Entrance is at the northeast entrance to Birkenhead Park. It consists of three arches flanked by lodges and is in Ionic style. The entrance was designed by Lewis Hornblower, with amendments by Joseph Paxton, the designer of the park. The park, and its entrance, were opened in 1847. The Grand Entrance is recorded in the National Heritage List for England as a designated Grade II* listed building.

The Swiss Bridge, a 23-foot (7.01 m) pedestrian span of stringer construction built in 1847, is unique as being the only covered bridge of traditional wooden construction (similar to North American and European covered bridges) in the United Kingdom. It was modelled after similar wooden bridges in Switzerland. (Note: A similar bridge, the Swiss Bridge, Cardiff Castle, designed by William Burges in the 1870s, was demolished in the 1960s.)

The Roman Boathouse stands by the lake in the park, the upper storey was originally intended to be a bandstand. It is built in stone and consists of a square pavilion with a segmental arch to the boathouse, above which is an arcaded and pilastered storey and a pantile roof.

The Cricket Pavilion was built in 1849, designed by Lewis Hornblower, in brick with a Welsh slate roof and has a single storey. In front of it is a timber verandah carried on cast iron Corinthian columns. This has three gables, with a clock in the apex of the central gable, and the date 1846, the date of the founding of the club. It is one of the earliest surviving cricket pavilions in the country.

The Jackson Memorial Drinking Fountain near the main entrance to Birkenhead Park is in the form of an obelisk that was made in 1860. It is in polished granite, and stands on a pedimented plinth surrounded by steps. It is dedicated to John Somerville Jackson who was instrumental in the creation of the park.

== Facilities ==
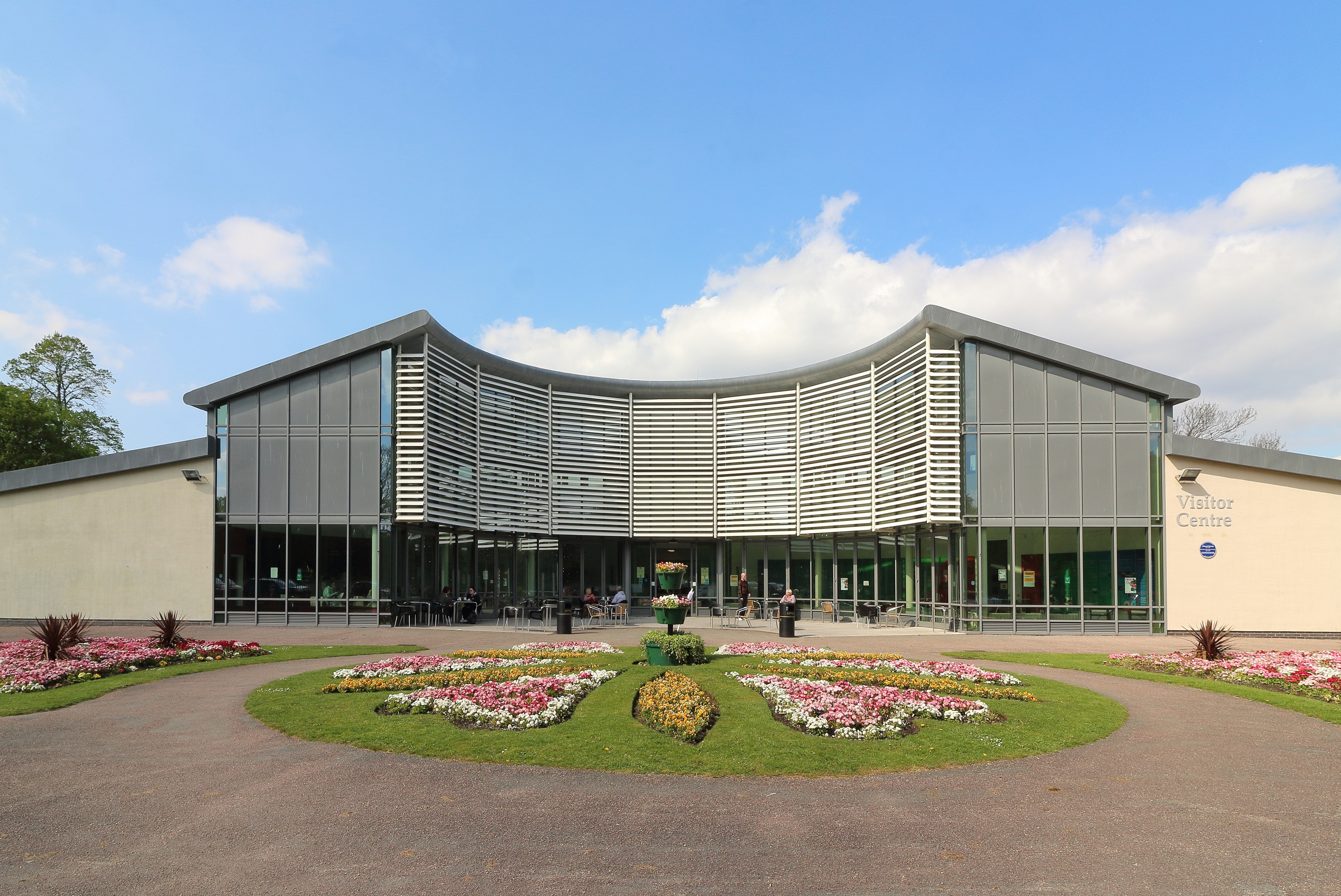
The visitor centre

There is a visitor centre with cafe, a children's play area, landscaped gardens, two cricket clubs, a rugby club, rockery, tennis courts, bowling greens, football pitches, two large fishing lakes, a fitness trail and woodland walks.

== Sporting activities ==
- Birkenhead Park Cricket Club opened in 1847. Its clubhouse was built in 1849. It now plays in the Liverpool and District Cricket Competition.
- Football was permitted in the park from 1861.
- Birkenhead Park FC began playing rugby in the park in 1871. The club has hosted major national and international matches including the All Blacks in 1978.
- Social cycling events and competitive criterium cycle races are held on Park Drive, the park's circuit road.
- Birkenhead parkrun is a free weekly timed 5 km (3.1 mi) run that takes place every Saturday. It starts at the Claughton Village entrance to the park and consists of two laps round the upper half of the park.

== See also ==
- Birkenhead Park railway station
- Derby Arboretum
- Listed buildings in Birkenhead
