= River Jordan, Liverpool =

River in Liverpool, United Kingdom

Coordinates: 53.369°N 2.933°W

View near Aigburth Road, in 2016

The River Jordan, Little Jordan or Otterspool Brook is a small tributary of the River Mersey. It has now been culverted for most of the lower part of its course, which runs through Otterspool Park in Aigburth, Liverpool.

The river had two tributaries, the Upper and Lower Brooks. The Upper Brook rose near the playing fields in Wavertree, flowing past, and inspiring the name of, the Brook House pub. The Lower Brook had a source in Wavertree Botanic Gardens, where it rose in two ponds near Edge Lane; both branches joined in present-day Sefton Park before flowing through a series of natural cascades into the Otterspool, a creek on the Mersey shore. The watercourse was recorded in the 13th century Chartulary of Whalley Abbey as the "Oskelesbrok", when it was described as forming the boundary of Toxteth, and flowing into "Oterpol". The name, also written as "Haskelesbroc" and "Hoskellesbrok" in the period, may contain a reference to the Old Norse personal name Askell.

The brook later gained the name of the "River Jordan", probably during the 17th century when Toxteth Park was disparked and let as farmland. The first tenants were Puritan in religion and this has been suggested as the origin of the name "Jordan", as well as that of a nearby farm called "Jericho" and a rock called "David's Throne". Otterspool itself was one of the most important of the Mersey fisheries well into the 18th century, and was reputed to be the finest salmon fishery in the area.

The course of the river was changed radically in the 19th century, when housing developments and parks were laid out and much of the watercourse was incorporated into a series of ornamental water features. The Upper Brook was dammed in Greenbank Park to form a lake, and both it and the Lower Brook were channelled into the Boating Lake in Sefton Park. Below this point, the river is currently visible near the gates of Otterspool Park but has been culverted from that point, though many features of its valley are still visible in the park. The area of the river mouth is now part of the Otterspool Promenade, where the river's flow is now piped to the Mersey.
