= Sefton Park =

Public park in south Liverpool, England

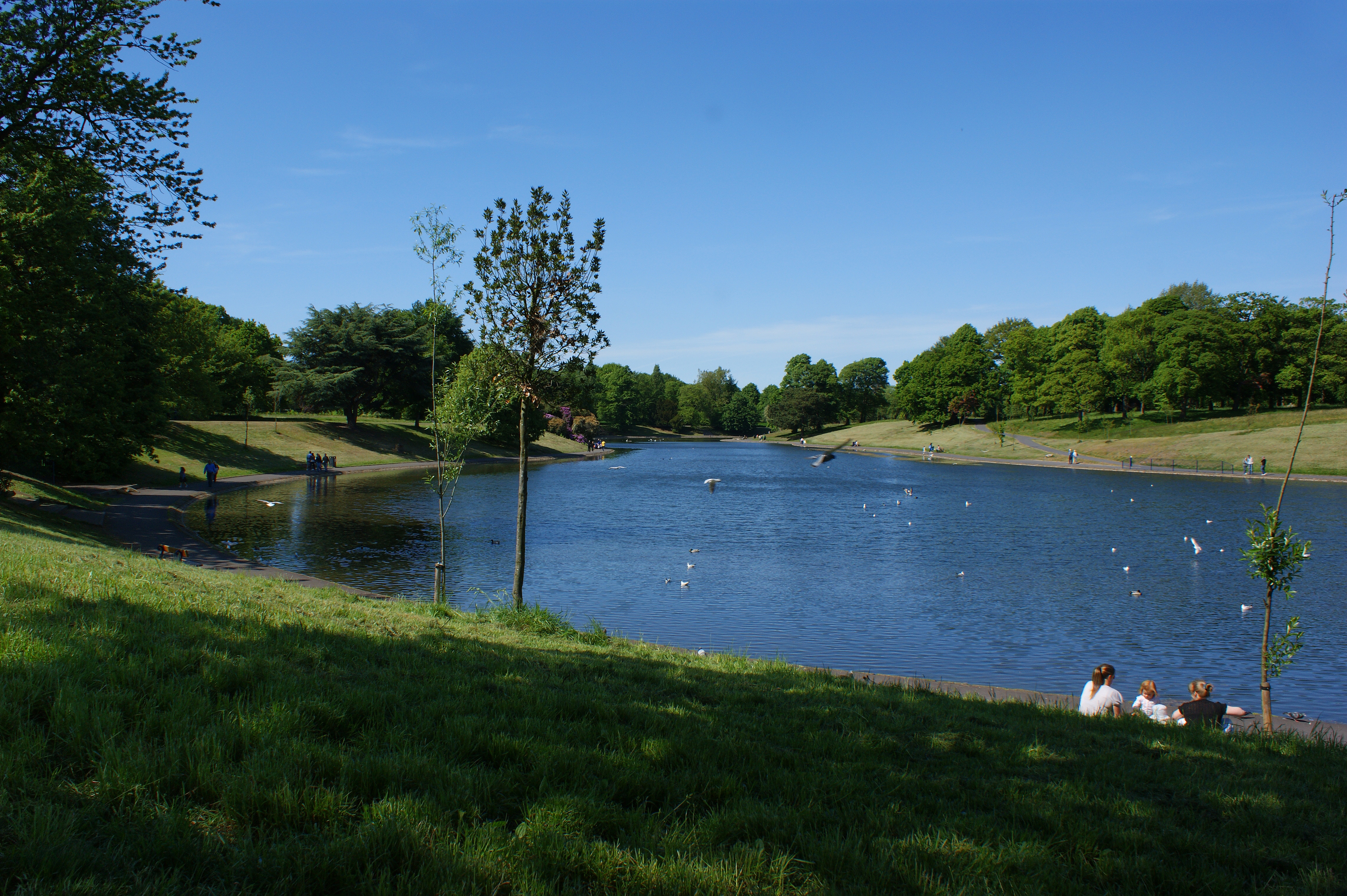
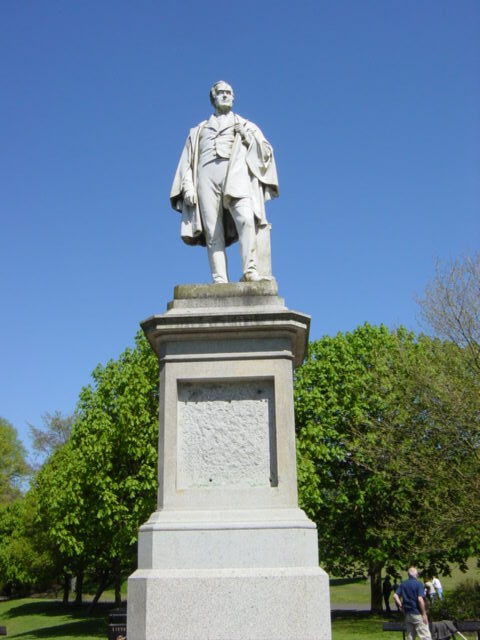
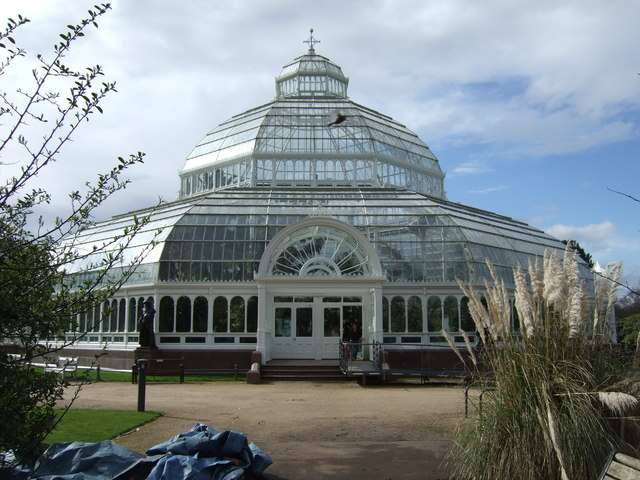
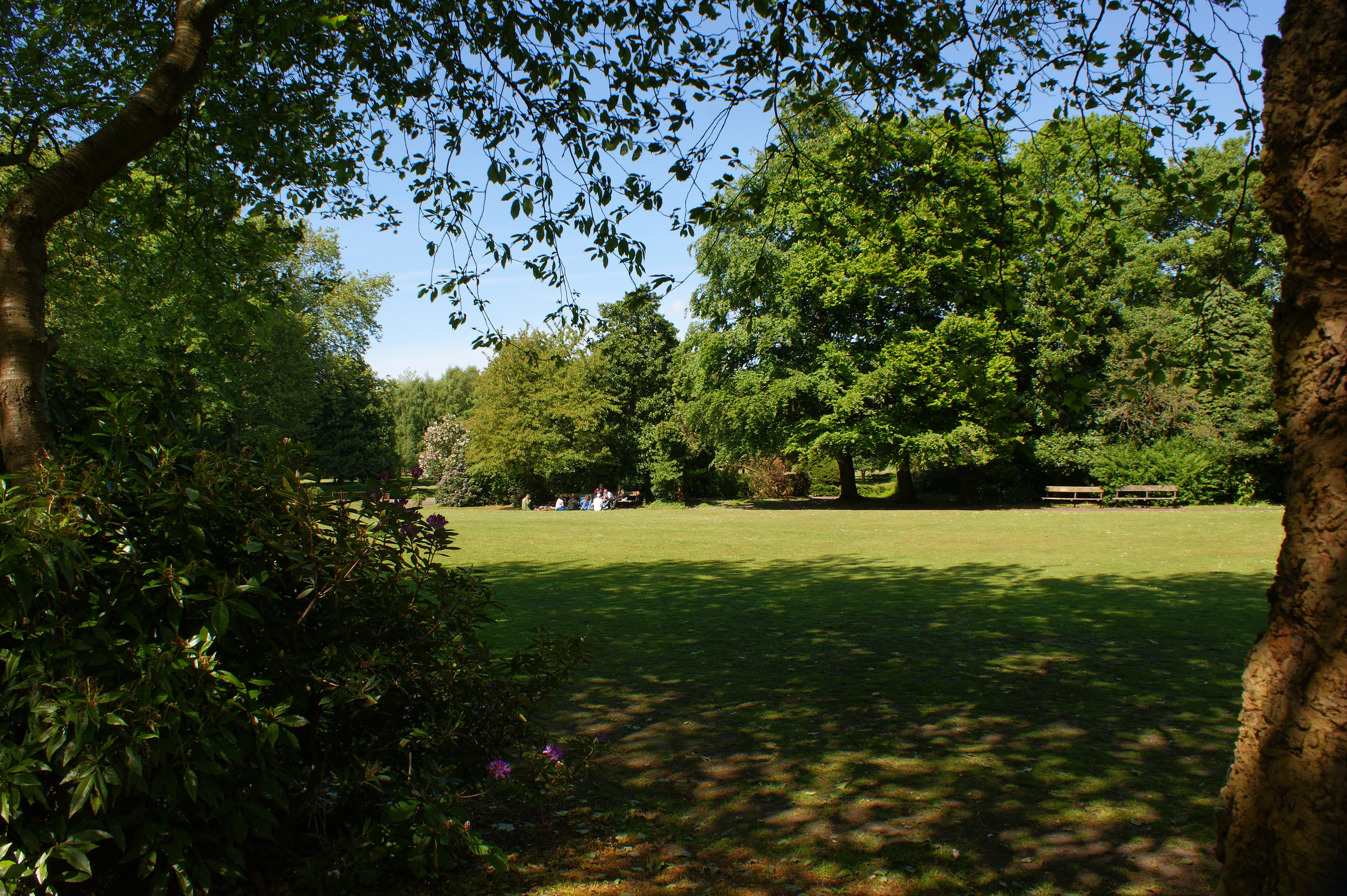
- Interactive map of Sefton Park
- Type: Public park
- Location: Sefton Park, Liverpool, England
- Coordinates: 53°23′N 2°56′W
- Area: 235 acres (0.95 km^{2})
- Created: 20 May 1872
- Operator: Liverpool City Council
- Status: Open all year round

Sefton Park is a public park in south Liverpool, England. The park is in a conservation district of the same name, It is the largest public park in Liverpool and the Liverpool City Region. (Note: The largest green space in Liverpool and the Liverpool City Region is Croxteth Hall estate, however this is a Country Park not a public park. Sefton Park is the largest public park) Suburbs neighbouring the park include Toxteth, Aigburth, Mossley Hill, Wavertree and St Michael's Hamlet. The park is located roughly within the historic bounds of the large area of the former Royal Park, Toxteth Park.

The park is 235 acres (95 ha) in area and is designated by English Heritage at Grade I in the Register of Historic Parks and Gardens.

== History ==
The site of the park was once within the boundaries of the 2,300-acre (930 ha) Royal Deer Park of Toxteth which became "disparked" in 1591. The land eventually came under the control of the Earl of Sefton.

As Toxteth rapidly grew, green fields and woodland of Toxteth Park became narrow streets and courts packed by tiny houses where air was stagnant, little or no sanitation, with running water supplied by a single tap in the middle of each court. At the same time, there was demand for large aristocratic mansions in the South of Liverpool. In 1862 the Borough Council Engineer recommended a site for this development. The "Public Works (Manufacturing Districts) Act 1864" permitted corporations to borrow sums of money, of up to £500,00, to be repaid over thirty years. This allowed steps to be taken towards land purchase for Sefton Park. In 1867 the council purchased 375 acres (152 ha) of park land for development, for £250,000, from the Earl of Sefton.

Sefton Park is one of the largest in the "ribbon of parks" originally envisaged in 1850s by the Liverpool Improvement Committee and which came eventually to include Newsham Park and Stanley Park. Even though it was recognised by politicians that clean, fresh open spaces were a necessity, there was an outcry from the public that a sum of £250,000 was extravagant and wasteful. The park's layout was funded by selling plots of land for housing on the perimeter of neighbouring Prince's Park.

Soon after, a European competition was launched to design a grand park. 29 entries were received and the competition was won by a French landscape architect Édouard André with work on the design also undertaken by Liverpool architect Lewis Hornblower. The park was opened on 20 May 1872 by Prince Arthur who dedicated it "for the health and enjoyment of the townspeople".

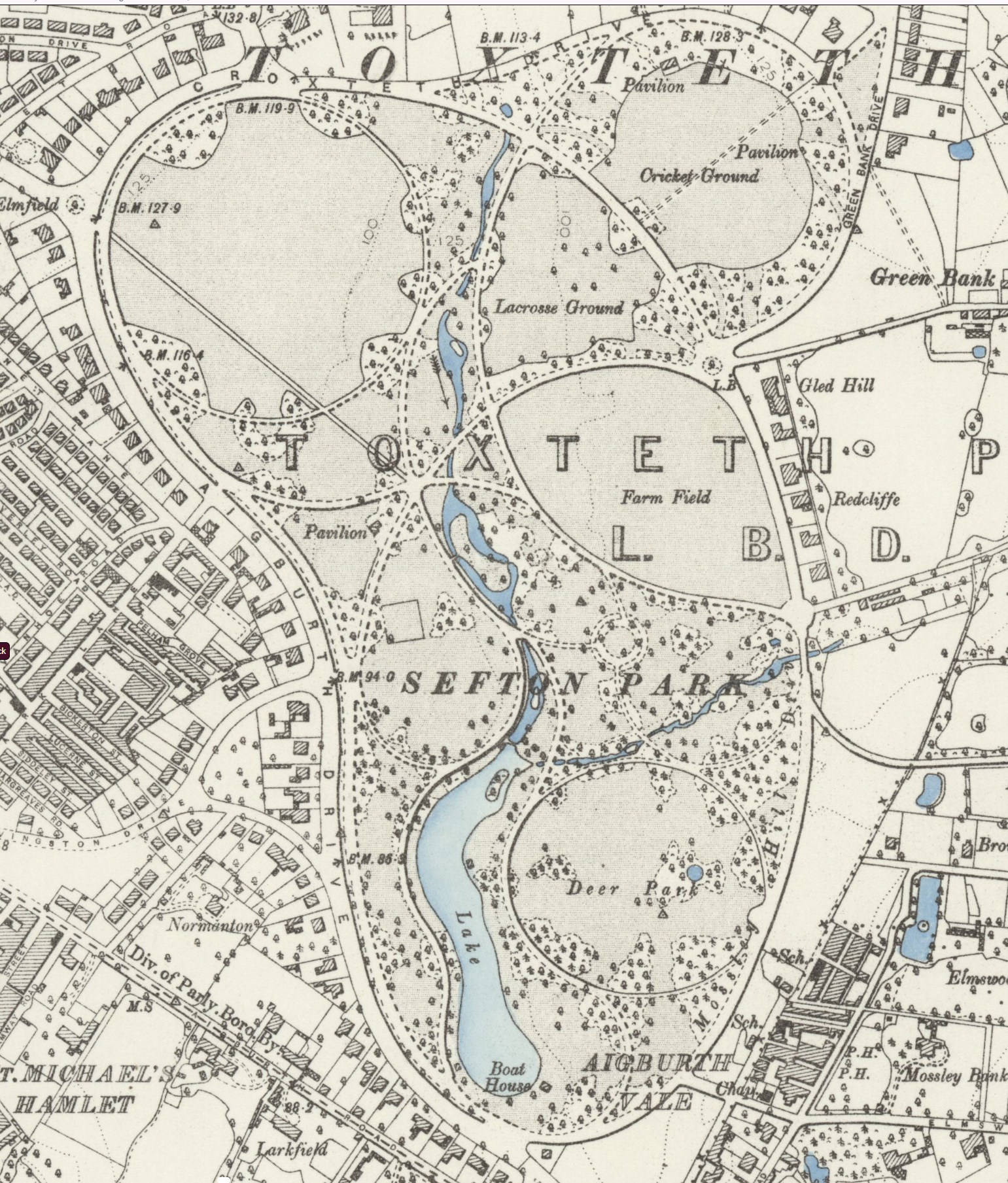
Map of Sefton Park, published 1894

The Park design is based on circular, oval and marginal footpaths, framing green spaces, with two natural watercourses flowing into a 7-acre (2.8 ha) man-made lake. Hornblower's designs for the park lodges and entrances were elaborate structures, and included follies, shelters and boathouses. The parkland itself included a deer park and a strong water theme with pools, waterfalls and stepping stones. Exclusive villas and ornamentation of the park reflected the city's grandeur during the [[[Victoian era|mid-Victorian period]] when Liverpool was the second city of the British Empire.

The perimeter road's outer edge is lined with Victorian buildings constructed to around 1890, and Edwardian houses. Additional park development continued with the construction of the iron bridge in 1873.

The park had a gallops which led to it being nicknamed "the Hyde Park of the North" but was always referred to by locals as "The Jockey Sands".

A major park improvement programme was undertaken in 1983, for the International Garden Festival, and 30 years later (2013) Sefton Park was granted the prestigious Green Flag Award for high standards.

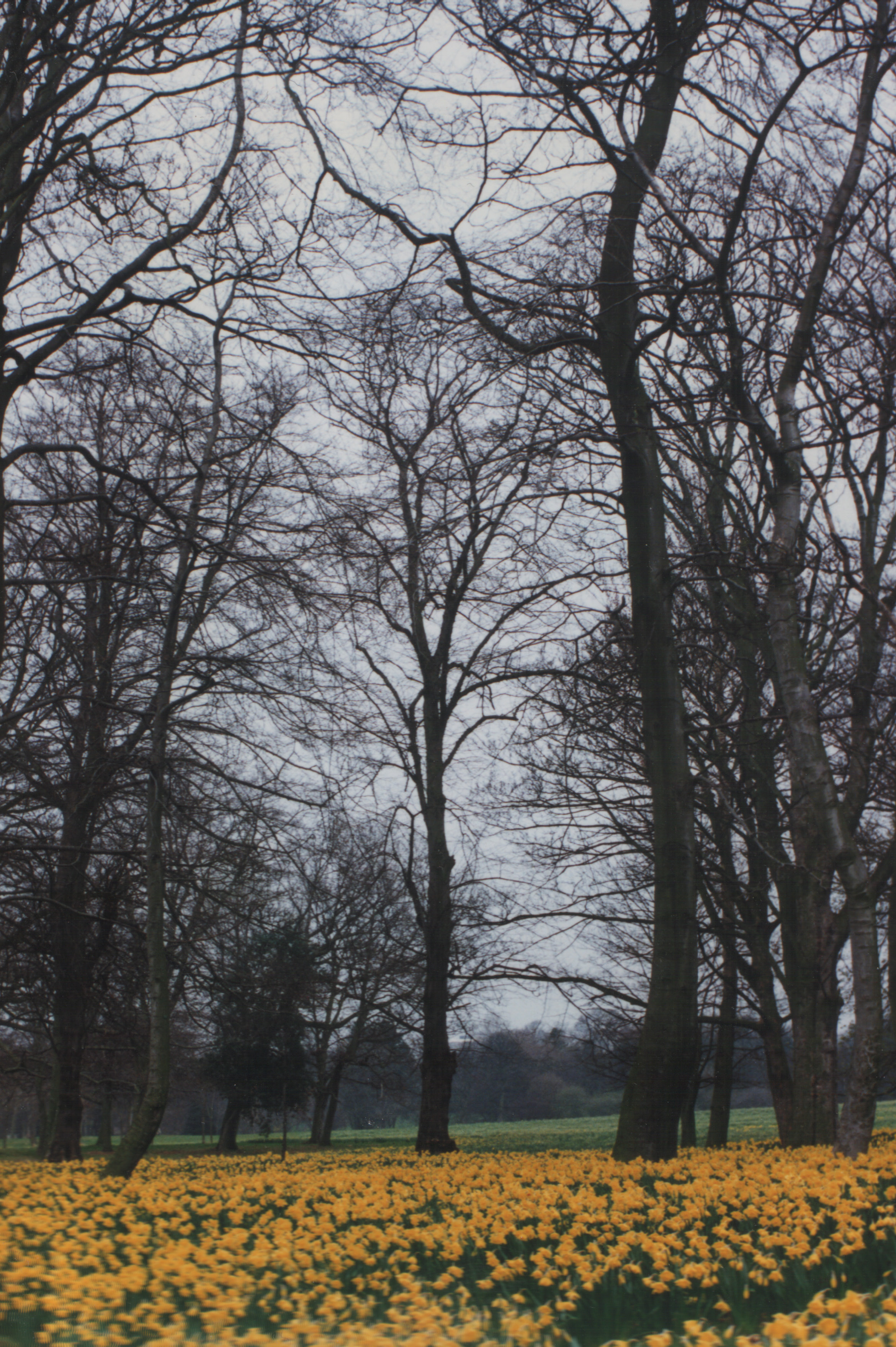
Sefton Park

== Sporting uses ==
Sefton Park Cricket Club moved their ground to the park in 1876 and W. G. Grace was amongst the three Gloucestershire players who made up a "South of England" who won there in 1877. The park also has tennis courts, a bowling green, and a popular jogging circuit. It is also used every November to hold the European Cross Country Championships trial races for the British team, and makes up part of the route of various annual road races including the Liverpool Half Marathon, Rock & Roll Marathon and Spring 10k.

== Entertainment uses ==
The park has also been a site for Royal Liverpool Philharmonic Orchestra's summer pops season, Africa Oyé and the Moscow State Circus. Bands have also played at the park in the '80s such as Echo and the Bunnymen.

In 2025 it was announced by the BBC and the Liverpool City Regional Authority that the park would be the location for the music festival, BBC Radio 1's Big Weekend in May 2025. The Savoy Jazzmen play there on the first Tuesday of each month from 2pm, with other events like tea dances at other times.

The nearest rail station is St Michaels, some 1 mile (1.6 km) distant.

== Restoration ==
In 2005 the park received provisional approval for a major £5& million Heritage Lottery Fund renovation project which involves the refurbishment and improvement of many of the park's features. The work began in June 2007 and was expected to be completed in summer 2009. This work was controversial, with some regular users of the park claiming that it involved the destruction of trees and of bird breeding sites. The work led to the formation of the "Friends of Sefton Park" campaigns.

== Notable features of the park ==
=== Palm House ===
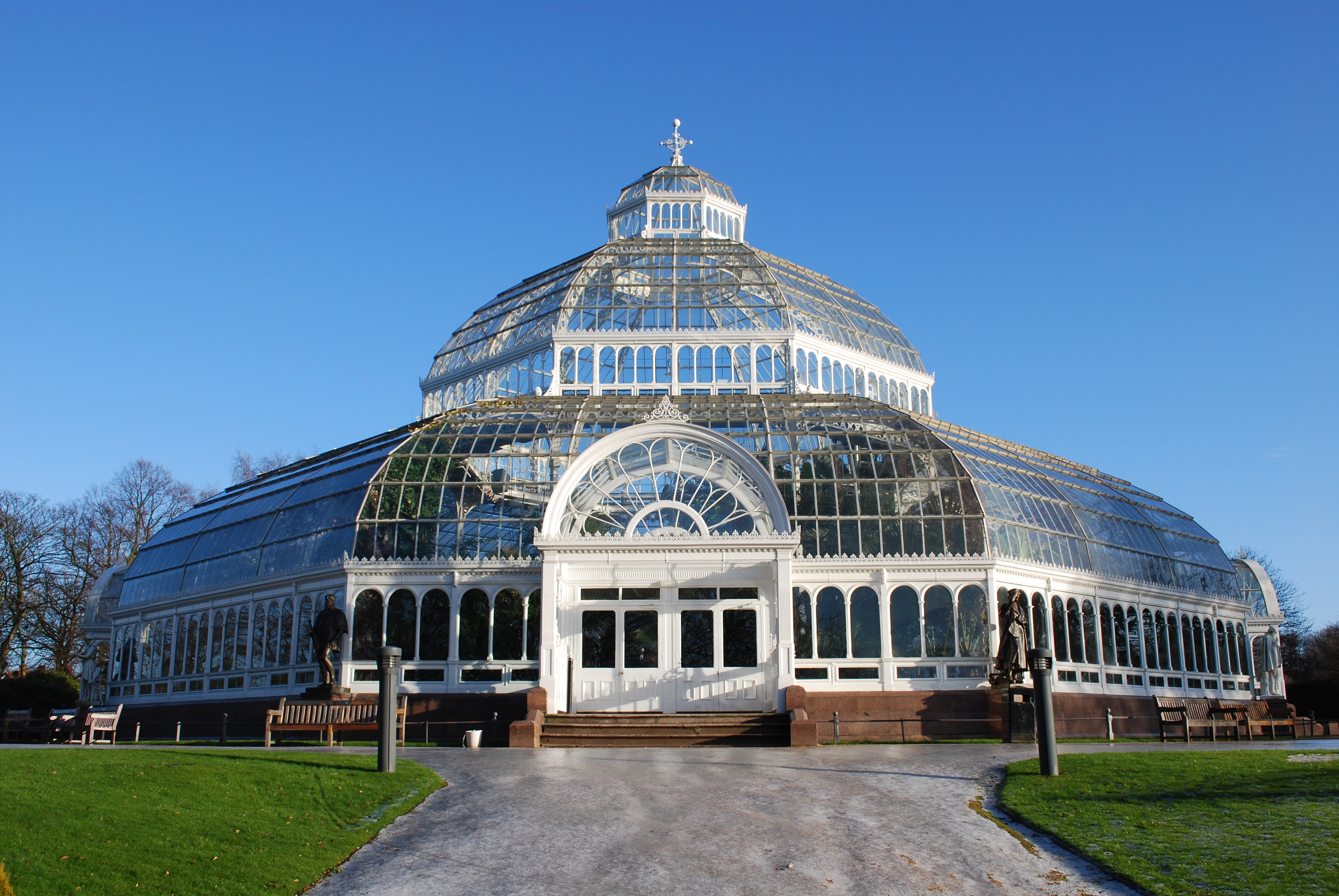
Sefton Park Palm House

This is a Grade II* three-tier dome conservatory palm house designed and built by MacKenzie and Moncur of Edinburgh which opened in 1896. Liverpool millionaire Henry Yates Thompson (the great nephew of the founder of Princes Park) gifted £10,000 to the city to fund the construction. It was designed in the tradition of Joseph Paxton's glass houses and was stocked originally with a rich collection of exotic plants.

During the Liverpool Blitz of May 1941 a bomb fell nearby and shattered the glass. It was reglazed in 1950 at a cost of £6,163 with costs covered by War Restoration funds. A period of decline and deterioration culminated in its closure in the 1980s on grounds of safety.

In June 1992, a public meeting was held highlighting the dereliction and calling for restoration. A petition was presented to the City Council by what had become the "Save the Palm House" campaign. A public fund raising campaign was established, with a "sponsor a pane" programme generating over £35,000. This led directly to the conversion of Save the Palm House into a registered charity (Friends of Sefton Park Palm House). Among the supporters of the project were Liverpool jazz singer George Melly and actress Margi Clarke; Melly described it as "the magical palace of my childhood" and "a fairy castle". The Palm House was partially repaired and reopened in 1993. It was fully restored at a cost of £3.5 million with Heritage Lottery and European funding and reopened in September 2001. It is now both a popular visitor attraction offering free and paid-for public entertainment and is venue for hire.

The eight 'corners' of the Palm House are marked by statues by the French sculptor Léon-Joseph Chavalliaud. These include explorers Captain Cook, Christopher Columbus, navigators Gerardus Mercator and Henry the Navigator, botanists and explorers Charles Darwin, Carl Linnaeus and John Parkinson and landscape architect Andre le Notre. Inside the Palm House are two sculptures by Benjamin Edward Spence "Highland Mary" and "The Angel's Whisper".

Statues around the Palm House

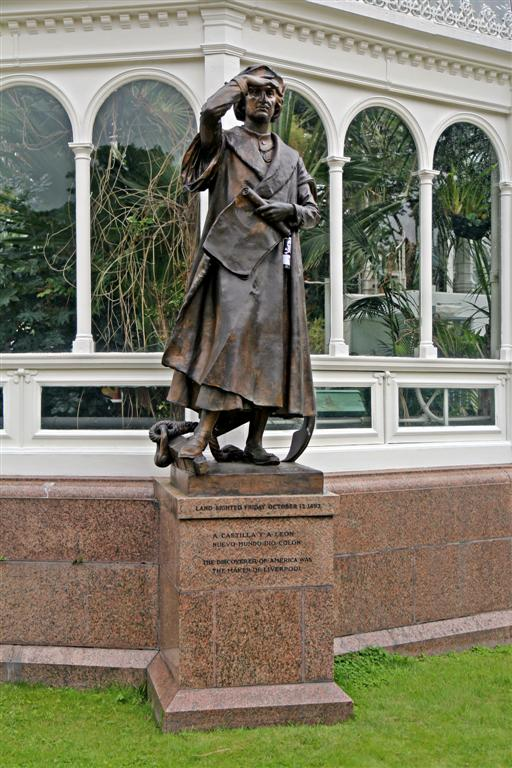
Christopher Columbus

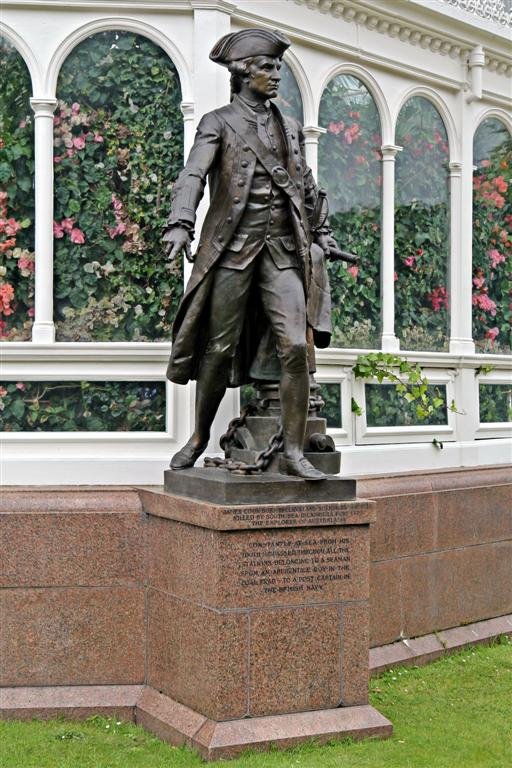
Captain James Cook

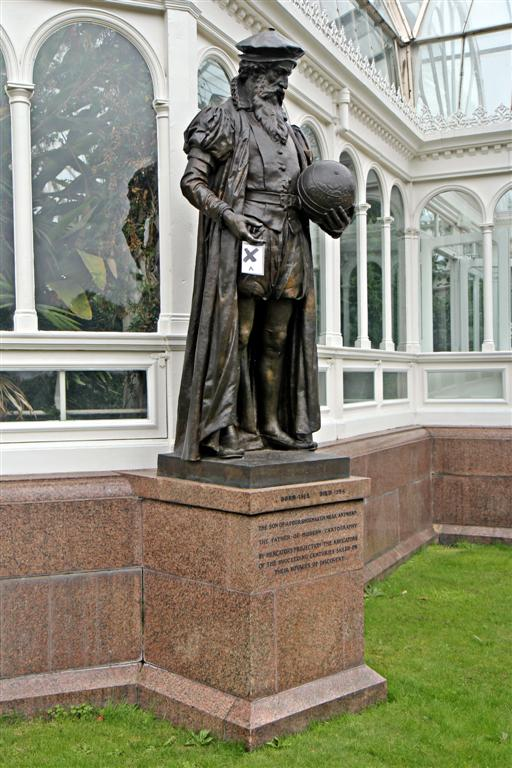
Gerardus Mercator

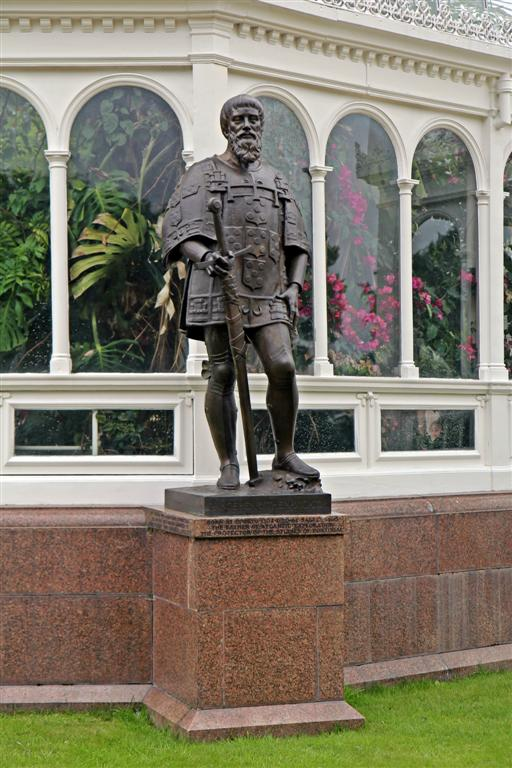
Henry the Navigator

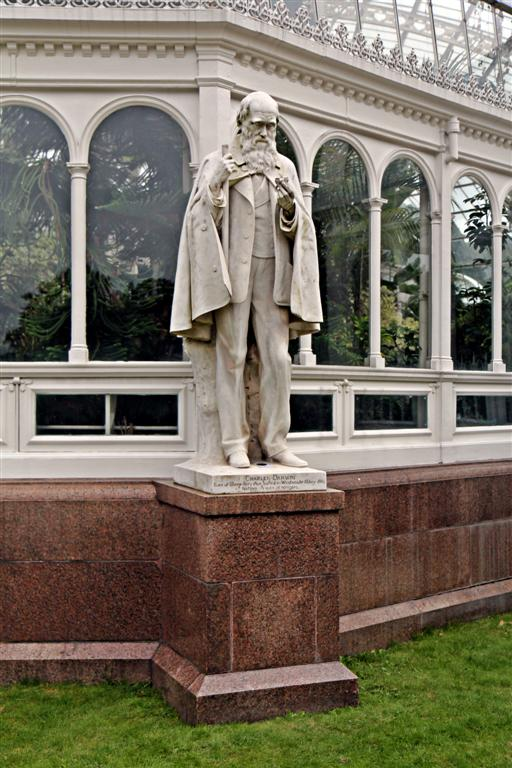
Charles Darwin

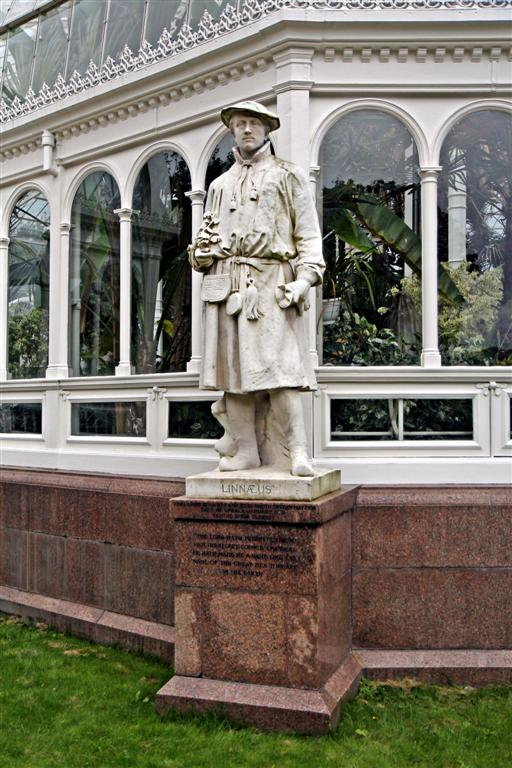
Carl Linnaeus

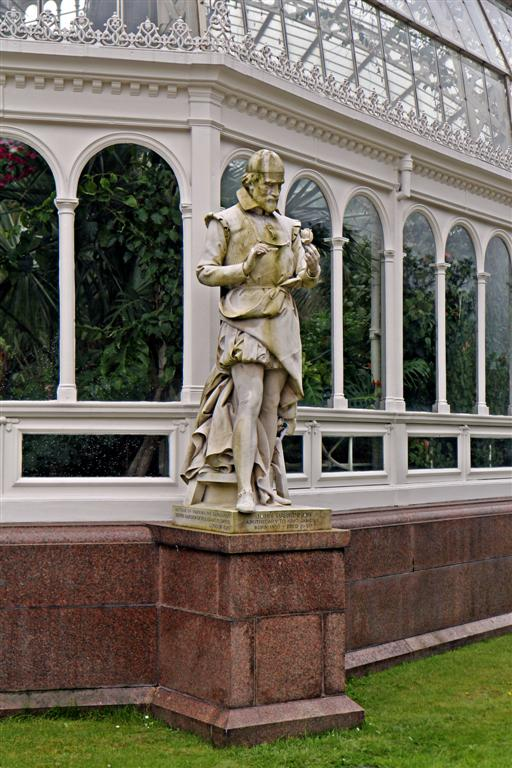
John Parkinson

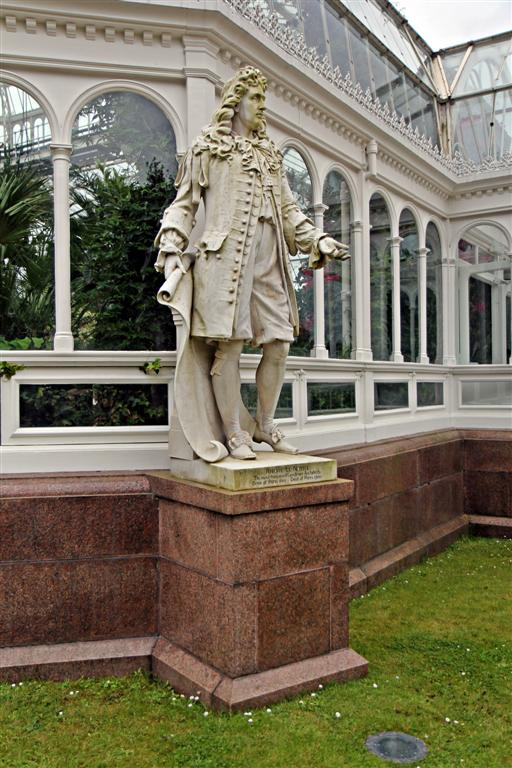
André le Nôtre

The grounds of the Palm House feature a statue of Peter Pan which was one of the last works by the British sculptor Sir George Frampton. This is Grade II listed and is a replica of a similar statue given as a gift for the visiting public to Kensington Gardens by author J.M. Barrie. The statue was donated to the park by George Audley in 1928 and was unveiled in the presence of Barrie. It originally sat in Sefton Park but was damaged in the 1990s. It was restored at Liverpool's Conservation Centre, and returned to the more secure location of the Palm House's grounds in December 2005.

=== Shaftesbury Memorial Fountain and Anteros statue ===
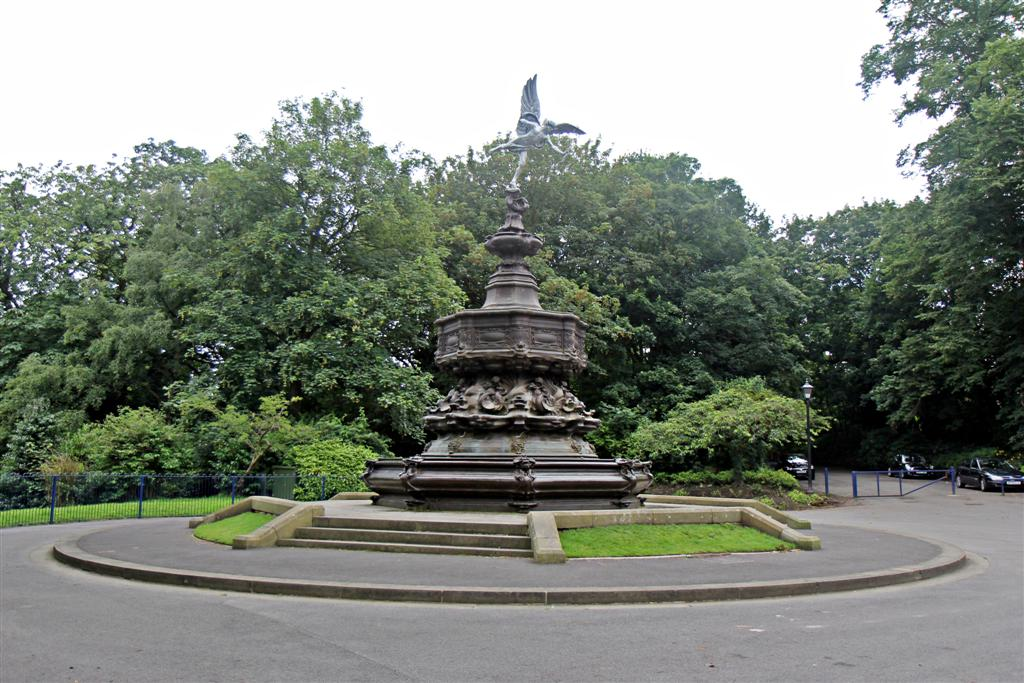
The Shaftesbury Memorial Fountain

This is Grade II listed and situated in the centre of the Park next to the café and former site of the aviary. The fountain, made from bronze and aluminium, was unveiled in 1932 and is a replica of the Shaftesbury Memorial Fountain created by Sir Alfred Gilbert in London's Piccadilly Circus. It was restored in 2008 with a new aluminium Anteros statue replacing the original, which was residing in Liverpool's Conservation Centre before the centre closed to the public. (Note: Like the original in Piccadilly, the statue is commonly but incorrectly referred to as "Eros".)

=== Obelisk ===
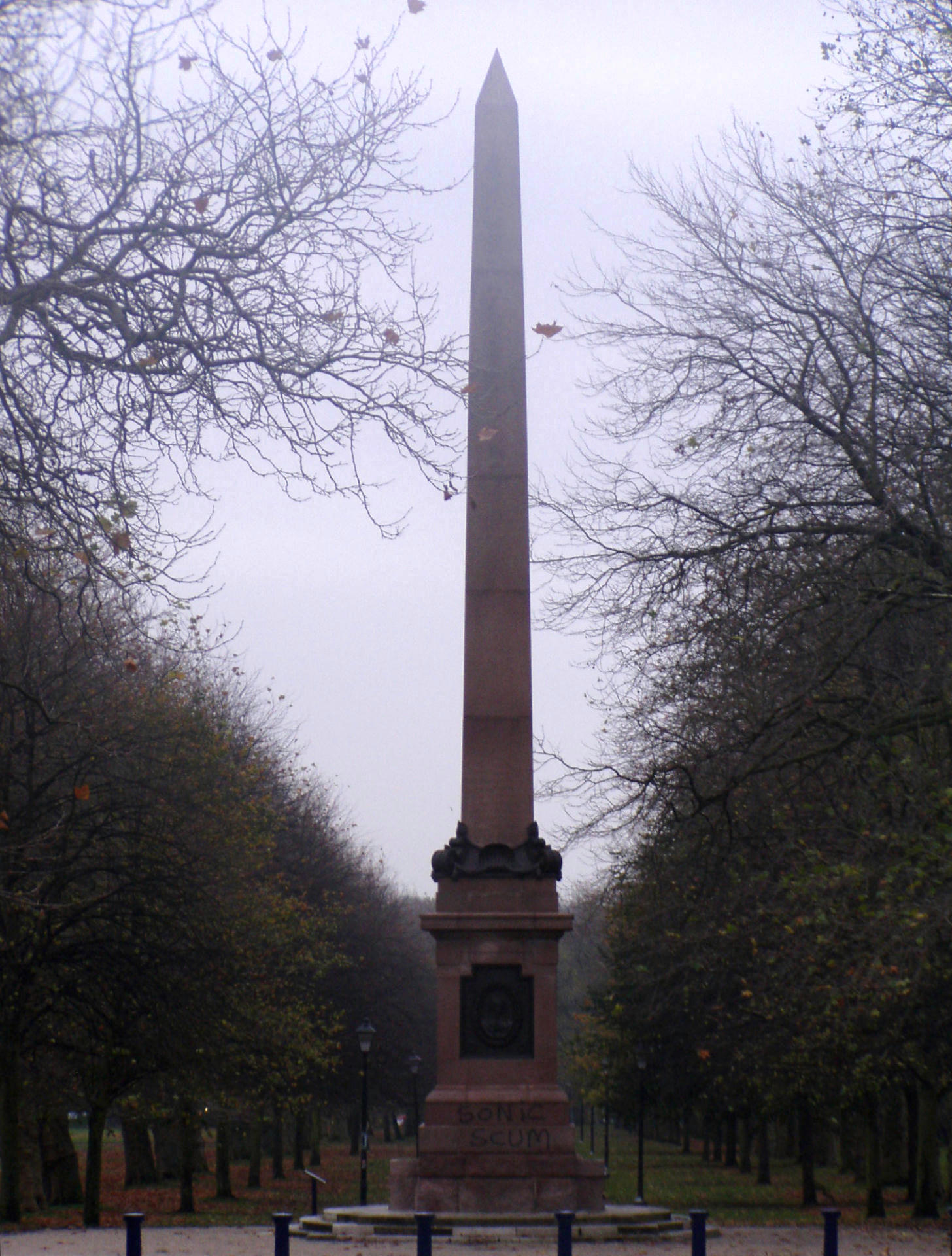
Obelisk: A monument to Samuel Smith.

The principal entrance to the Park, opposite Lodge Lane, is the location of the Samuel Smith memorial. This is in the form of a tall granite obelisk, which stands at the head of an avenue leading to the park’s central plaza, where the Shaftesbury fountain and central cafe stand, and where the aviary once stood.

The obelisk is mounted on a plinth with two (now non-functioning) drinking fountains either side (N&S); above each is the legend "Whosoever drinketh of this water shall thirst again. But whosoever drinketh of the water that I shall give them shall never thirst", taken from St. John's Gospel. Above the fountains on each side of the plinth are four bronze plaques representing Smith's life and work. The front plaque (W) bears an image of Samuel Smith in high relief; and the two sides (N&S) have images of Christian charity, and the rear (E) plaque bears an inscription detailing his biography, and underneath "Them that honour Me, I will honour". The plaque also states that the monument was raised by public subscription. The obelisk is Grade II listed.

=== Other statues and facilities ===
The park features a Gothic drinking fountain and several prominent statues including a memorial to William Rathbone V by Sir Thomas Brock unveiled in 1887. There is a bandstand, popular since the Victorian era, which is said to be the inspiration for The Beatles' song "Sgt. Pepper's Lonely Hearts Club Band". An iron bridge was opened in 1873 which spans the Fairy Glen. There is a café in the centre of the park called the Aviary Cafe and a pirate themed children's play area opened in 2009.

=== Review field ===
Barrage balloons and anti-aircraft guns were established on the Review Field in the Second World War.

=== Field of Hope ===
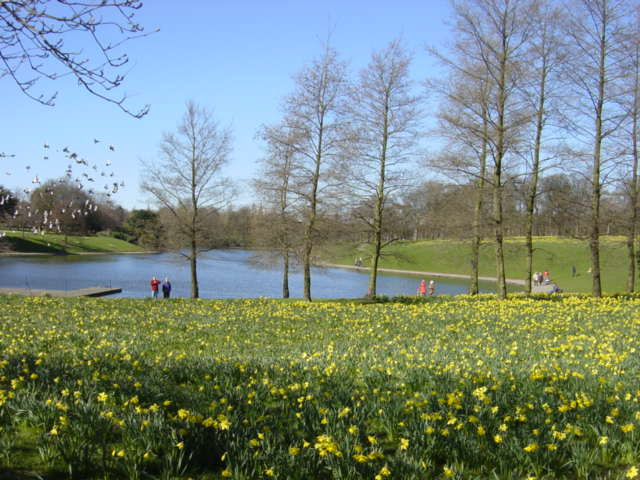
Field of Hope, Sefton Park

The Field of Hope is an area in the south-east quarter of the park. It was planted with thousands of daffodil bulbs through a charitable planting programme and continues to bloom each year. In 1990 the Marie Curie centre in Woolton, which had received a donation of daffodils from Geests to be used for fundraising, had the idea of planting a "Field of Hope" in order to inspire cancer sufferers and carers. In co-operation with the city council, a million daffodils were planted across the south-east corner of the park. This has led to similar fields being established in other parts of the city, including Stanley Park, Clarke Gardens, and Woolton Village.

== Former features of the park ==
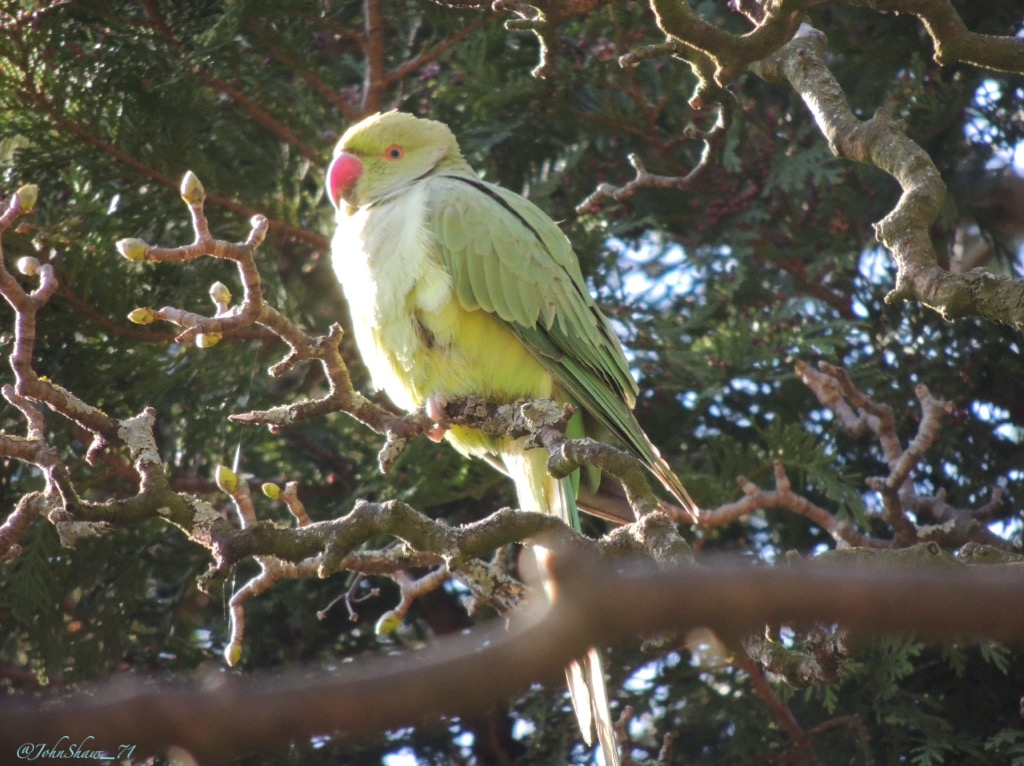
Rose-ringed parakeet in Sefton Park.

=== Aviary ===
An aviary was introduced to the park in 1901 and was home to many exotic birds. After falling into disuse in the 1980s, the old cages were removed during the restoration project and replaced with a new curved viewing point overlooking new outside planting.

=== The Concert ===
The park also boasted a small open-air theatre – "The Concert" – near the café which featured singers, magicians and talent contests to entertain local children during the summer holidays. This was removed in the 1970s.

=== Boating lake ===
The lake was a popular venue for boating until the 1970s, with a jetty and boat hire facilities. The lake was totally emptied in 2007 for the extensive renovation work and all of the fish (which included specimen weights of carp, tench, roach, pike and golden orf) were caught with large nets and sent to various locations across the UK. Following its restoration, the lake was refilled in 2010.

=== Others ===
There was a small pirate ship located in one of the lakes until the early 1990s when it was removed due to falling into disrepair.

Ringo Starr mentions the park in his song "In Liverpool" on his album "Ringo 2012".

== See also ==
- Birkenhead Park
- Princes Park, Liverpool
- List of public art in Liverpool
