= Lewis Hornblower =

British architect (1823–1879)

Lewis Hornblower (1823–1879) was a Liverpool architect, who along with French landscape architect Édouard André was responsible for the design of Sefton Park in Liverpool.

Hornblower who had been involved with both Birkenhead Park, in Birkenhead, where he had designed the Grand Entrance, and Princes Park, in Liverpool, where he had been involved in architectural work on features such as gates, bridges and lodge houses.

Hornblower and André's entry was successful from the twenty nine competition entries received by Liverpool Corporation from across the United Kingdom in 1867. A prize of 300 guineas was awarded.
