= Listed buildings in Birkenhead =

The post office is one of numerous listed buildings in Birkenhead

Birkenhead is a town in Wirral, Merseyside, England. Its central area contains 150 buildings that are recorded in the National Heritage List for England as designated listed buildings. Of these, six are listed at Grade I, the highest of the three grades, six at Grade II*, the middle grade, and the others are at Grade II, the lowest grade. This list contains the listed buildings in the central area of the town, and the other listed buildings are to be found in separate lists.

Birkenhead did not develop as a town until the 19th century. Before that, a Benedictine priory was established in the 1170s, and the monks ran a ferry across the River Mersey. By 1811, the priory was in ruins, but a ferry was still in existence, carrying passengers to the growing port of Liverpool. The lord of the manor, with the intention of creating a bathing resort, built a few streets and commissioned the building of St Mary's Church next to the priory site. However, Birkenhead developed as an industrial town rather than a resort starting from 1823 when William Laird built a boiler factory. This grew into a shipbuilding yard, and Laird commissioned James Gillespie Graham to design residential accommodation. A rectangular street plan was envisaged, with Hamilton Square, which was built from about 1825, as the centrepiece. As the town grew, some of the streets were almost 2 miles (3,220 m) long.

In 1843 it was decided to build a park in the town; this is Birkenhead Park, the first park in the world to be financed from public funds. The park was designed by Joseph Paxton and the building was supervised by Edward Kemp. Entrances, gateways, lodges, and other structures were designed for the park by Lewis Hornblower and John Robertson. Meanwhile, high-class residential accommodation was being built both around the park and in other areas, such as Clifton Park, the layout and buildings designed by Walter Scott and Charles Reed. At the same time, the shipbuilding industry was developing, and more docks were being built, initially by J .M. Rendell, and later by J.B. Hartley. During the 20th century, two road tunnels were built under the River Mersey, the first being the Queensway Tunnel, built in 1925–34 between Birkenhead and Liverpool, and designed by Basil Mott and John Brodie, with Herbert J. Rowse as engineer. This has impressive entrances and ventilation stations.

The listed buildings reflect the history of the town, the oldest being the ruins of the priory and its renovated chapter house. The next listed buildings date from the 19th century, and include houses, shops, churches, public houses, buildings associated with the park, buildings associated with Flaybrick Hill Cemetery, docks and associated structures, and street furniture. Later in the century and in the early 20th century, public buildings were built, together with a railway station, statues and memorials, a Quaker meeting house and, later in the 20th century, structures associated with the Queensway Tunnel.

== Key ==
Grade	Criteria
I	Buildings of exceptional interest, sometimes considered to be internationally important
II*	Particularly important buildings of more than special interest
II	Buildings of national importance and special interest

== Buildings ==
Name and location	Photograph	Date	Notes	Grade
Ruins of Birkenhead Priory; 53.38965°N 3.01191°W		1150	The ruins of a Benedictine priory, which was extended up to 1400, are around the former cloister. In the north range is the vaulted undercroft of the refectory, in which an education room has been created. The west range is unroofed. Further to the east are parts of the walls of the former priory church.	I
Chapter House Chapel, Birkenhead Priory; 53.38960°N 3.01150°W		Late 12th century	The former chapter house is in the east range of the priory. It is in stone with a Westmorland slate roof, in two storeys with two bays. There is a stained glass window in the east wall of the lower storey. The upper room was restored in 1913–19 by Edmund Kirby, and has been used as a meeting room.	II*
St Mary's Church; 53.38956°N 3.01128°W		1819–21	The church was designed by Thomas Rickman, extended in 1832–35, but largely demolished in 1975. It is built in brick and faced in stone. What remains is the steeple, and parts of the nave and transepts. The steeple consists of a two-stage tower with a clock in the lower stage, an embattled parapet, and a recessed spire with lucarnes.	II
17 Brandon Street; 53.39287°N 3.01441°W		c. 1825	A brick house, later used as an office, with a Welsh slate roof. It has two storeys, and a three-bay front containing a door with a fanlight. The windows on the front are sashes, and those on the left side have been replaced.	II
1–18 Hamilton Square; 53.39429°N 3.01545°W		c. 1825	A terrace of 18 houses by James Gillespie Graham, they are in ashlar-faced brick with a Welsh slate roof. The houses are in three storeys with attics and basements, and each house has a three-bay front. At the ends are projecting pavilions, and the middle four bays also project forward; these have Doric porches with entablatures. The windows are sashes, and the railings in front of the houses are included in the listing.	I
58–63 Hamilton Square; 53.39366°N 3.01425°W		c. 1825	A terrace of six houses, later used as offices, by James Gillespie Graham. They are ashlar-faced with a Welsh slate roof, and in three storeys with attics and basements, each house having a three-bay front. The outer houses project forward and have engaged Doric columns in the upper storeys; the inner houses have Doric porches. The windows are sashes, and the railings in front of the houses, and the gate piers are included in the listing.	I
Former stables and carriage houses 53.39272°N 3.01449°W		c. 1825	Originating as the stables and carriage houses of 52–57 Hamilton Square by James Gillespie Graham, they are in brick with Welsh slate roofs. The building is in two storeys with the remains of carriage doorways, later altered. Some original openings in the upper floor have survived.	II
1–6 Mortimer Street; 53.39336°N 3.01395°W		c. 1825–30	A terrace of six houses, partly used as offices, in ashlar-faced brick with a Welsh slate roof. They are in three storeys with basements, and each house has a two-bay front, other than No. 1, which has five bays. The doorways are approached by steps, they have fanlights, and the windows are sashes. Along the top is a moulded cornice and a pediment. The railings in front of the houses are included in the listing.	II*
6 Duncan Street; 53.39253°N 3.01466°W		c. 1830	A brick house, later used as offices, with a Welsh slate roof. It has three storeys and a five-bay front, with a two-storey rear wing. There is a central plain doorway with a fanlight, and the windows are sashes.	II
St Werburgh's Church; 53.38952°N 3.02175°W		1835–37	A Roman Catholic church attributed to M. E. Hadfield in Neoclassical style. It is in sandstone with a Welsh slate roof, and a rusticated basement. The west end is pedimented and has a protruding porch. The church has a five-bay nave with protruding confessionals on the north side.	II
St Werburgh's Presbytery; 53.38941°N 3.02176°W		1835–37	The presbytery was built as an integral part of St Werburgh's Church. It is in sandstone with a Welsh slate roof and has two storeys. There is a symmetrical three-bay front, and it has a central doorway with an architrave and a fanlight. The original sash windows have been replaced.	II
3–9 Market Street, 90 and 92 Chester Street; 53.39150°N 3.01410°W		c. 1837	A row of four shops, incorporating the former Albion Hotel, by Edward Welch. They are in stone, and have two storeys with a basement. There are five bays in Market Street; these contain 20th-century shop fronts. The Chester Street front has three bays, a central doorway, a balcony, windows with architraves, and a pediment.	II
19–34 Hamilton Square; 53.39393°N 3.01712°W		1839–45	A terrace of 16 houses, later used as offices, by James Gillespie Graham. They are ashlar-faced with a Welsh slate roof, and in three storeys with attics and basements, each house having a three-bay front. The outer houses project forward and have engaged Doric columns in the upper storeys; the inner houses have Doric porches. The windows are sashes, and the railings in front of the houses, and the gate piers are included in the listing.	I
35–50 Hamilton Square, 30A Hamilton Street; 53.39278°N 3.01647°W		1839–45	A terrace of 17 houses, later used as offices, by James Gillespie Graham. They are ashlar-faced with a Welsh slate roof, and in three storeys with attics and basements, each house having a three-bay front. The outer houses project forward and have engaged Doric columns in the upper storeys; the inner houses have Doric porches. The windows are sashes, and the railings in front of the houses, and the gate piers are included in the listing.	I
24, 26 and 28 Hamilton Street; 53.39418°N 3.01441°W		c. 1840	A row of three ashlar-faced shops with a Welsh slate roof in three storeys. There are five bays on Hamilton Street, two on John Street, and curved bays on the corners. On the ground floor are shop fronts, and sash windows with architraves and segmental pediments in the middle floor. The top floor has mullioned and transomed casements.	II
30, 32 and 34 Hamilton Street; 53.39247°N 3.01577°W		c. 1840	A row of three ashlar-faced shops with a Welsh slate roof in three storeys. Each shop has a two-bay front, and in the ground floor are a variety of windows and doorways. In the storeys above are sash windows, those in the middle floor with entablatures on consoles, and four have cast iron balconies.	II
42 and 44 Hamilton Street; 53.39205°N 3.01607°W		c. 1840	A pair of stuccoed shops with a Welsh slate roof. They have three storeys and a three-bay front. In the ground floor are shop fronts, and in the middle storey are sash windows, The central window has an architrave with an entablature and the outer windows have three lights and segmental pediments.	II
8 Lowwood Road; 53.38737°N 3.02512°W		c. 1840	A stuccoed house with a concrete tiled roof in two storeys. It has an L-shaped plan with a full-height porch in the angle. The porch has a crow stepped gable containing a shield and with a finial, a Tudor arched doorway, and a hood mould. Both wings are gabled and contain bay windows. The windows are mullioned and contain sashes.	II
29–47 Market Street; 53.39225°N 3.01655°W		c. 1840	A row of ashlar-faced shops with Welsh slate roofs partly renewed with tiles. They have two storeys, with shop fronts on the ground floor and sash windows above. Along the top is a moulded cornice and a parapet. At the rear is a three-storey outbuilding, also with a shop front and sash windows; this is included in the listing.	II
53 and 55 The Woodlands; 53.38840°N 3.02589°W		c. 1840	A pair of ashlar-faced houses with a Welsh slate roof, in two storeys, each house having a three-bay front. The porches are on the sides, the doorways are approached by steps, and they have architraves. The ground floor is rusticated and has windows with voussoirs, and the upper floor windows have architraves, with a pediment over the central windows.	II
57 and 59 The Woodlands; 53.38842°N 3.02545°W		c. 1840	A pair of ashlar-faced houses with a Welsh slate roof, in two storeys, each house having a two-bay front. The porches are on the sides, the doorways are approached by steps. The ground floor is rusticated and has segmental-headed windows with voussoirs, and the upper floor windows have architraves with entablatures.	II
Copperfield public house 53.39228°N 3.01591°W		c. 1840	The public house is in brick with stone dressings and a Welsh slate roof. It has three storeys, with five bays on Hamilton Street, three on Market Street, and a curved bay between. In the ground floor are round-headed windows and doorways, and sash windows above. The corner bay contains a blocked former doorway, and the first floor window has a moulded architrave.	II
Sonny's on the Square; 53.39291°N 3.01741°W		c. 1840	Originally two houses, later a public house, it is ashlar-faced on brick, and has a Welsh slate roof. The building has four storeys, and a six-bay front. In the rusticated ground floor are three segmental-headed windows flanking round-headed doorways with fanlights. Above are sash windows, those in the first floor with entablatures.	II
Former Mews; 53.39351°N 3.01371°W		c. 1840	Originally part of the mews to houses in Hamilton Square, the building is in stone with a Welsh slate roof. It is in two storeys, and contains doorways and windows.	II
River View public house 53.39395°N 3.01246°W		c. 1840	A public house and three houses on a corner site, they are in stuccoed brick with roofs of Welsh slate and concrete tiles. The building has three storeys; there are four bays on Bridge Street, seven bays on Chester Street, and a curved bay between them. In the ground floor are doorways with fanlights, a pub window, a canted bay window, and sash windows. The upper floors contain sash windows, some with moulded architraves and pediments.	II
10 Ashville Road; 53.39346°N 3.04717°W		c. 1840–50	An ashlar-faced house with a tiled roof in picturesque Gothic style by John Hay. It has two storeys and an asymmetrical front of two bays. The entrance is in the centre and has a gabled porch with an arched doorway. The right bay projects forward, is gabled, and has a traceried window in each floor. In the left bay is a dormer with an ornate gable. On the left side is a stair tower and a conservatory.	II
12 and 14 Ashville Road; 53.39327°N 3.04747°W		c. 1840–50	A pair of brick houses with stone dressings and a Welsh slate roof in Tudor style. They have two storeys with basements and attics, and each house is in two bays, the outer bays being gabled. The entrances are on the sides with gabled porches. The railings in front of the basement area, and the gate piers are included in the listing.	II
15 and 17 Ashville Road; 53.39497°N 3.04087°W		c. 1840–50	A pair of brick houses with stone dressings and a Welsh slate roof in Tudor style. They have three storeys, and each house has a four-bay front, the outer two bays of each house projecting forward and gabled with fretted bargeboards. The entrances are on the sides, and the windows are sashes. At the rear are Dutch gables.	II
16 Ashville Road; 53.39310°N 3.04781°W		c. 1840–50	An ashlar-faced house with a Welsh slate roof in Italianate style. It has two storeys and three bays. The central entrance has a projecting porch with pairs of Doric columns and an entablature, and the door has a fanlight. The windows are sashes. In front of the house are panelled gate piers with shallow pyramidal copings; these are included in the listing.	II
59 and 61 Ashville Road; 53.39304°N 3.04665°W		c. 1840–50	A pair of ashlar-faced houses with Welsh slate roofs in picturesque French Renaissance style. They have two storeys, attics and a basement, and are designed and orientated separately. Features include gables, one of which is a Dutch gable, and an octagonal turret. The gate piers are included in the listing.	II
4 and 5 Cavendish Road; 53.39588°N 3.04362°W		c. 1840–50	A brick house with diapering and a Welsh slate roof, in two storeys with attics, and a symmetrical two-bay front. The inner bays are gabled, and the windows are mullioned and transomed. The entrances are on the sides, and have segmentally-headed doorways with architraves and fanlights.	II
31 and 33 Clifton Road; 53.38608°N 3.02412°W		c. 1840–50	A pair of stuccoed houses by Walter Scott with concrete tiled roofs. They have two storeys and a symmetrical four-bay front, with a recessed wing on the outsides, each containing a porch. The central two bays project forward and are pedimented. The windows are sashes.	II
34 and 36 Clifton Road; 53.38667°N 3.02454°W		c. 1840–50	A pair of houses by Walter Scott, mainly stuccoed and partly pebbledashed, with a Welsh slate roof. They have two storeys and a symmetrical four-bay front. The outer bays project forward, and have a canted bay window in the ground floor, and window with an entablature above. The central bays are rusticated and contain a window in both storeys; all the windows are sashes. On the sides are doorways with moulded architraves and pediments.	II
40 Clifton Road; 53.38633°N 3.02479°W		c. 1840–50	A house, formerly one of a pair, by Walter Scott, it is ashlar-faced with a rusticated ground floor and a Welsh slate roof in Classical style. It has two storeys and a symmetrical three-bay entrance front. The central doorway has an architrave and an entablature with a sculpted lion. On the street front are two bays, the left projecting forward and containing a segmental bay window. The windows are sashes, and at the top of the house is a balustraded parapet.	II
42 Clifton Road; 53.38610°N 3.02502°W		c. 1840–50	An ashlar-faced house with a Welsh slate roof by Walter Scott in Tudor Gothic style. It has a single storey at the front with a basement at the rear, and an asymmetrical plan. The entrance front has a projecting gabled wing with a Perpendicular window, and steps leading up to an arched doorway. On the right side are three gables and a canted bay window. There are elaborate chimney stacks.	II
1 and 3 Hollybank Road; 53.38545°N 3.02544°W		c. 1840–50	A pair of stuccoed houses with a Welsh slate roof. They have two storeys, and a four-bay front, the bays divided by full-height pilasters. The entrances are on the sides, they are approached up steps, and have moulded architraves and fanlights. The windows are sashes.	II
12 Lowwood Road; 53.38762°N 3.02623°W		c. 1840–50	A stone house, originally a vicarage, with a hipped Welsh slate roof, in two storeys with a symmetrical two-bay front. The central doorway has an architrave and an acanthus frieze, and is flanked by square bay windows. In the upper floor are three-light sash windows with cast iron colonettes and entablatures on consoles.	II
2 Park Road South; 53.39045°N 3.03657°W		c. 1840–50	A house, later used as offices, in stone with a Welsh slate roof. It has two storeys and a basement, and a symmetrical five-bay front. The central doorway has a Doric porch, and the windows are sashes. The ground floor windows are round-headed; those in the upper floor have entablatures on brackets, the central window being pedimented.	II
8 and 10 Park Road South; 53.39043°N 3.03739°W		c. 1840–50	A pair of stone houses with a Welsh slate roof, in two storeys and attics. The entrances are on the sides, and each house has a two-bay front. The central bays are gabled with wavy bargeboards and project forward, each containing a canted bay window. The other windows are sashes.	II
16 and 18 Park Road South; 53.39044°N 3.03813°W		c. 1840–50	A pair of stone houses with a Welsh slate roof, in two storeys and attics. The entrances are on the sides, and each house has a two-bay front. The central bays are gabled with wavy bargeboards and project forward, each containing a canted bay window. The other windows are sashes.	II
90 and 92 Park Road South; 53.39064°N 3.04454°W		c. 1840–50	A pair of ashlar-faced houses with a concrete tiled roof in two storeys and with a six-bay front, the central two bays projecting forward. The doorways are on the sides, the left doorway having an architrave with fluted shafts. At the rear are seven bays and a central pediment.	II
140 and 142 Whetstone Lane; 53.38488°N 3.02526°W		c. 1840–50	A pair of ashlar-faced houses, the ground floor rusticated, with a Welsh slate roof. They are in two storeys with basements, and each house has a three-bay front. Each has a central doorway approached by steps, with a fanlight, an architrave, and an entablature. The windows are sashes, those in the ground floor having cast iron colonettes, and in the upper floor with architraves and entablatures. Between the floors is a rose frieze, and at the top of the house is a modillion cornice. The railings, walls, and gate piers are included in the listing.	II
144 Whetstone Lane; 53.38478°N 3.02506°W		c. 1840–50	A stuccoed brick house with a Welsh slate roof in three storeys and three bays. The doorway is in the left bay, it is round-headed with recessed Doric engaged columns and a blind fanlight. The windows are sashes.	II
Central Lodge, Birkenhead Park; 53.39482°N 3.04247°W		c. 1840–50	The lodge is in the centre of the park, and is ashlar-faced with a concrete tiled roof. It is in two storeys, and has three bays and a single-storey entrance block containing a doorway with an architrave. The ground floor is rusticated, and the windows are sashes. At the top is a balustraded parapet and corner fluted finials.	II
11 and 13 Market Street; 53.39163°N 3.01433°W		c. 1842	A pair of stone shops. the ground floor rusticated, with a Welsh slate roof. They have three storeys, and a seven-bay front. The windows are sashes, those in the ground floor being round-headed, and flanking doors. The windows in the middle floor have architraves, and the central window has a segmental pediment.	II
23 and 25 Clifton Road; 53.38682°N 3.02370°W		c. 1843	A stuccoed house with a Welsh slate roof by Walter Scott. It has two storeys and a symmetrical front, with each house having two bays. The gabled outer bays project forward, and each contains a canted bay window with a parapet. The windows are sashes, those in the ground floor having mullions and round heads.	II|centre
24 Clifton Road; 53.38740°N 3.02402°W		c. 1843	An ashlar-faced house with a Welsh slate roof by Walter Scott. It has two storeys and a symmetrical five-bay front. The ground floor is rusticated, with steps leading up to a central Doric portico. The windows are sashes, those in the ground floor are round-headed, in the upper floor they have architraves with entablatures, and the central window is pedimented. At the top of the house is a moulded cornice and a central pediment.	II
30 and 32 Clifton Road; 53.38688°N 3.02436°W		c. 1843	A pair of houses by Walter Scott, partly stuccoed, and partly pebbledashed, with a Welsh slate roof. They have two storeys, and each house has a two-bay front. The outer bays project forward, are gabled, and contain a canted bay window in the ground floor, and above a window in a round-headed architrave and with a balcony. The entrances are on the sides, with fanlights and architraves, above which are a pair of windows with mask keystones, lion corbels, swags, and a balcony.	II
47 and 49 Clifton Road; 53.38535°N 3.02498°W		c. 1843	A pair of stone houses with a Welsh slate roof by Walter Scott in Italianate style with two storeys and a basement. The entrance front has three bays with a Doric porch and a balustraded parapet. At the rear are five bays, with a cast iron balcony on the ground floor, and a stone balcony on the upper floor carried on square columns. The windows are sashes.	II
Fearnley Hall; 53.38787°N 3.02682°W		1843	An ashlar-faced house, later divided, with a Welsh slate roof, by Walter Scott in Gothic style. It has two storeys with attics, and consists of one long range, a shorter parallel range, and a gabled wing. The windows are mullioned, and the gable on the west side is surmounted by an octagonal lantern.	II
Gate piers, Birkenhead Park; 53.39507°N 3.04335°W		c. 1843–44	Four stone gate piers at the Ashville Road entrance to the park flanking the main and side gates. They have shallow panels and pyramidal copings.	II
Gate piers, Birkenhead Park; 53.39476°N 3.04277°W		c. 1843–44	Five stone gate piers at the Park Drive entrance to the park flanking the main and side gates. They have shallow panels and pyramidal copings.	II
1 Cavendish Road; 53.39522°N 3.04315°W		c. 1843–47	Originally a lodge to Birkenhead Park, later used as a house, it was designed by Lewis Hornblower and John Robertson. The house is in stone with a Welsh slate roof, and is in picturesque Tudor style. It is in two storeys with an L-shaped plan, and has a gabled bay on the left and a projecting gabled porch. In the bay is a projecting mullioned and transomed window, above which is a two-light window. Above the doorway is a dormer.	II
Gate piers, Birkenhead Park; 53.39043°N 3.03579°W		c. 1843–47	Four ashlar gate piers at the Park Drive entrance to the park flanking the main and side gates. They have incised panels, shallow pyramidal caps, and a modillion cornice.	II
Gate piers, Birkenhead Park; 53.39051°N 3.04410°W		c. 1843–47	Five ashlar gate piers at the Park Road South entrance to the park flanking the main and side gates. They have panels, shallow pyramidal copings, and a modillion cornice.	II
Gate piers, Birkenhead Park; 53.39516°N 3.05341°W		c. 1843–47	Five ashlar gate piers at the Park Road West entrance to the park flanking the main and side gates. They have moulded panels, shallow pyramidal caps, and a modillion cornice.	II
Gate piers, gates and railings, Birkenhead Park; 53.39443°N 3.04447°W		c. 1843–47	A pair of ashlar gate piers with incised panels and shallow pyramidal copings at the entrance to the park on Ashfield Road. Between them are plain cast iron gates, and flanking them are cast iron railings with spear-heads, mounted on a low stone wall.	II
Castellated Lodge, Birkenhead Park; 53.39527°N 3.05345°W		c. 1843–47	The lodge is at the Park Road West entrance to the park and was designed by Lewis Hornblower and John Robertson. It is in stone with a lead roof, in two storeys and with an asymmetrical plan. The lodge consists of a series of towers, one of them an octagonal staircase tower. The windows are mullioned and transomed. The tower, chimneys, and parapet are all castellated.	II
Gothic Lodge, Birkenhead Park; 53.39039°N 3.03608°W		c. 1843–47	The lodge is at one of the Park Road South entrances to the park and was designed by Lewis Hornblower and John Robertson. It is in sandstone with a Welsh slate roof, it has an L-shaped plan, and has two storeys. The main front is symmetrical in three bays with a central gabled porch, flanked by mullioned windows, and with gabled dormers above.	II
Italian Lodge, Birkenhead Park; 53.39056°N 3.04375°W		c. 1843–47	The lodge is at one of the Park Road South entrances to the park and was designed by Lewis Hornblower and John Robertson. It is ashlar-faced, has a Welsh slate roof, and is in Italianate style. The lodge has two storeys, and a complex plan, including a three-stage tower in the style of Osborne House with an open arcade in the top stage. There is a round-headed door in the tower, and the windows are sashes.	II
Norman Lodge East, Birkenhead Park; 53.39728°N 3.05021°W		c. 1843–47	The lodge is one of a pair at the Park Road North entrance to the park and was designed by Lewis Hornblower and John Robertson. It is ashlar-faced with a Welsh slate roof. The lodge is symmetrical with a two-storey central block, and projecting single-storey wings. The entrance is recessed, and has fluted Doric columns and a plain entablature. The windows have been renewed and have architraves.	II
Norman Lodge West, Birkenhead Park; 53.39722°N 3.05071°W		c. 1843–47	The lodge is one of a pair at the Park Road North entrance to the park and was designed by Lewis Hornblower and John Robertson. It is ashlar-faced with a Welsh slate roof. The lodge is symmetrical with a two-storey central block, and projecting single-storey wings. The entrance is recessed, and has Doric columns and a plain entablature. The windows have been renewed and have architraves.	II
Pavilion and boathouse, Birkenhead Park; 53.39403°N 3.03750°W		c. 1843–47	Standing by the lake in the park, the upper storey was originally intended to be a bandstand. It is built in stone and consists of a square pavilion with a segmental arch to the boathouse, above which is an arcaded and pilastered storey and a pantile roof.	II
Royden House; 53.39540°N 3.03712°W		c. 1843–47	Originally two houses, later divided into flats. It is ashlar-faced with a Welsh slate roof, and is in Italianate style. The house has three storeys and eight bays. The central two bays project forward, they contain a porch with three arcades, above which is a balustraded parapet. The windows are sashes. The gate piers and railings in front of the house are included in the listing.	II
Swiss Bridge, Birkenhead Park; 53.39332°N 3.03776°W		c. 1843–47	A footbridge over the lake leading to an island, it is mainly in timber with stone abutments, and a red tiled roof carried on wooden columns. Along the sides are parapets decorated with scallops, chevrons, and bulls' eyes.	II
51–57 Hamilton Square; 53.39283°N 3.01490°W		c. 1844	A terrace of six houses, later used as offices, by James Gillespie Graham. They are ashlar-faced with a Welsh slate roof, and in four storeys with basements, and 19 bays. The outer houses project forward and have engaged Doric columns in the upper storeys; the inner houses have Doric porches. The windows are sashes, and the railings in front of the houses are included in the listing.	I
31 Grosvenor Road; 53.38831°N 3.04411°W		c. 1844–48	A stuccoed house by Charles Reed with a Welsh slate roof. It has two storeys and a symmetrical three-bay front. This contains a central entrance with a portico porch, flanked by canted bay windows. In the upper floor are casement windows, the central window with an entablature on consoles.	II
2 and 3 Cavendish Road; 53.39559°N 3.04337°W		c. 1845	A pair of stone houses with Welsh slate roofs by John Hay in Tudor style. They have two storeys with attics, and are loosely symmetrical. At the rear are projecting gabled bays containing canted bay windows, and in the central bays are sash windows and a first-floor cast iron balcony. In the roof are gabled dormers.	II
11 Clifton Road; 53.38782°N 3.02300°W		c. 1845	An ashlar-faced house by Walter Scott in two storeys. It has a symmetrical front with three bays separated by pilasters. The central doorway has a moulded architrave with an entablature decorated with scrolls. The windows are sashes, those in the ground floor having three lights and pediments. At the top is a moulded cornice and a parapet.	II
21 Clifton Road; 53.38711°N 3.02360°W		c. 1845	A stuccoed house by Walter Scott with a Welsh slate roof, in two storeys and three bays. The central doorway has a fanlight, engaged columns, and a pediment, and is flanked by canted bay windows. The upper floor windows are sashes with architraves.	II
Masonic Temple; 53.38655°N 3.02391°W		c. 1845	Originally a house by Walter Scott, later remodelled for use as a Masonic Temple. It is ashlar-faced, in two storeys, and has a four-bay front, the bays divided by pilasters. Steps lead up to an entrance on the side, the doorway having an architrave. The upper storey windows have architraves and keystones flanked by scrolls. At the top is a modillion cornice, a panelled parapet, and urn finials on the corners.	II
St James' Church; 53.40185°N 3.05890°W		1845	The church, which stands on an island site, was designed by C. E. Lang in Early English style, and completed in 1858 by Walter Scott. It is built in stone with a Welsh slate roof, and consists of a nave, aisles, transepts, a chancel, and a northwest steeple. The steeple has a three-stage tower with buttresses, and a spire with lucarnes. At the west end of the church is a rose window, and there are flying buttresss between the transepts and the nave.	II
12 and 14 Park Road South; 53.39043°N 3.03778°W		c. 1840s	A pair of stone houses with a Welsh slate roof, in two storeys and attics. The entrances are on the sides, and each house has a two-bay front. The central bays are gabled with wavy bargeboards and project forward, each containing a canted bay window. The other windows are sashes.	II
Grand Entrance, Birkenhead Park; 53.39433°N 3.03304°W		1845–47	The entrance to the park was designed by Lewis Hornblower and modified by Joseph Paxton. It is in stone and consists of three arches flanked by lodges. The central arch is the largest, with unfluted Ionic columns, and an attic with a coat of arms and the date. Within the arches are cast iron gates. The lodges have two storeys and three bays, with sash windows and balustraded parapets.	II*
10 Clifton Road, 72 The Woodlands; 53.38810°N 3.02346°W		1846	A pair of houses by Walter Scott in picturesque Gothic style. They are ashlar-faced with Welsh slate roofs. The houses are at right angles to each other, with two storeys and an irregular plan. Features include gables, one of which is crow-stepped, and some with fretted bargeboards, mullioned windows with hood moulds, and a canted bay window. Between the houses is a single-storey castellated block.	II
Church of Christ the King; 53.39779°N 3.03726°W		1846–50	Designed by William Cole in Decorated style, the chancel was extended in 1892–93 by Charles Aldridge. It is built in sandstone with a Welsh slate roof. The church consists of a nave, deep transepts, a chancel, north and south vestries, and a west steeple. The steeple has a tower with a parapet containing fretted tracery, and flying buttresses linking it to a crocketed spire. Along the body of the church is an embattled parapet.	II
8 Ashville Road; 53.39361°N 3.04684°W		1847	A brick house with stone dressings and a Welsh slate roof, it is in Tudor style. The house has an asymmetrical plan with two storeys and attics, and has a front of four principal bays. There are two large gables and two smaller ones, and a two-storey bay window. The doorway is arched with a fanlight, the gable containing a coat of arms. The windows are mullioned.	II
94–104 Chester Street; 53.39131°N 3.01416°W		1847	A terrace of six ashlar-faced shops with Welsh slate roofs in Italianate style. They have three storeys and attics, and a front of 14 bays. In the ground floor are shop fronts, and above, are sash windows. Those in the middle floor have entablatures on consoles, and in the top floor they have rose corbels.	II
5–15 Cross Street; 53.39129°N 3.01448°W		c. 1847	A terrace of six ashlar-faced shops with Welsh slate roofs. They have three storeys and attics, and a front of 18 bays. In the ground floor are shop fronts and a central segmental archway. Above, the windows are sashes, those in the middle storey having entablatures on brackets, and in the top floor with architraves.	II
Gate piers, 47 and 49 Clifton Road; 53.38533°N 3.02518°W		c. 1847	A pair of ashlar gate piers, with panels containing incised decoration, and with shallow pyramidal caps.	II
Gate piers, Birkenhead Park; 53.39728°N 3.05049°W		c. 1847	Six ashlar gate piers at the Park Road North entrance to the park. They have recessed panels and shallow pyramidal copings.	II
Egerton Dock; 53.39884°N 3.02152°W		1847	The dock was designed by J. M. Rendel. It is built in sandstone and has cast iron furniture, including bollards. It is the only substantially surviving part of Rendel's original plan, and the dock is partly filled in.	II
Morpeth Dock; 53.39921°N 3.01553°W		1847	The dock was designed by J. M. Rendel, and was enlarged and reconstructed in 1868 by J.B. Hartley. It is faced with granite, has some cast iron dock furniture, and was linked by a lock to the River Mersey.	II
Cricket Pavilion, Birkenhead Park; 53.39143°N 3.04315°W		1849	Designed by Lewis Hornblower, the pavilion is in brick with a Welsh slate roof and has a single storey. In front of it is a timber verandah carried on cast iron Corinthian columns. This has three gables, with a clock in the apex of the central gable, and the date 1846, the date of the founding of the club. It is one of the earliest surviving cricket pavilions in the country.	II
5 and 7 Alton Road; 53.38243°N 3.04699°W		c. 1850	A pair of roughcast houses with a hipped Welsh slate roof. They have two storeys, and a symmetrical front with two bays to each house and the entrances on the sides. The outer bays each contain a canted bay window, and the other windows are sashes.	II
22 Argyle Street, 1 Price Street; 53.39321°N 3.01772°W		c. 1850	Originally a house, later a shop and a house. It is ashlar-faced with a Welsh slate roof, and has three storeys, two bays on Argyll Street and three on Prince Street. On Argyll Street is a shop front, the ground floor of Prince Street is rusticated and contains a doorway. The windows are sashes.	II
32, 34 and 36 Argyle Street; 53.39287°N 3.01792°W		c. 1850	A row of three stuccoed brick shops with a Welsh slate roof. They are in three storeys, with six bays on Argyll Street and five on Market Street. The ground floor in Argyll Street contains shop fronts, and on Market Street there are round-arched windows and a doorway. In the upper storeys are sash windows.	II
38–50 Argyll Street; 53.39251°N 3.01819°W		c. 1850	A row of seven brick shops with stone dressings and a Welsh slate roof. They are in three storeys, with twelve bays on Argyll Street and five on Lorn Street. There are shop fronts in the ground floor and sash windows above.	II
11 and 13 Ashville Road; 53.39506°N 3.04035°W		c. 1850	A pair of brick houses with Welsh slate roofs in two storeys with attics. They have a four-bay front, the outer bays projecting forward with bay windows and Dutch gables. The windows are sashes, those in the upper floors having architraves. In the gables are round-headed windows, and in the centre bays are round-headed gabled dormers.	II
8 Lowwood Grove; 53.38772°N 3.02591°W		c. 1850	A brick house with a hipped Welsh slate roof, in two storeys with a three-bay front. The central doorway has an architrave, above it is a pedimented gable, and it is flanked by canted bay windows. The windows are sashes.	II
25 and 27 Market Street; 53.39215°N 3.01619°W		c. 1850	A pair of ashlar-faced shops with a Welsh slate roof in four storeys and two bays. In the ground floor are shop fronts, and above are sash windows, those in the first floor having entablatures on brackets. Between the top floors is a large cornice.	II
56 – 66 Market Street; 53.39251°N 3.01684°W		c. 1850	A row of four shops and a public house, in brick with stone dressings and a Welsh slate roof. They have three storeys, each shop has a two-bay front, and the central public house has four bays. In the ground floor are shop fronts and the windows and entrances of the public house. The floors above contain sash windows.	II
20–30 Park Road South; 53.39042°N 3.03869°W		c. 1850	A terrace of six houses with a Welsh slate roof. They have two storeys with attics and basements. The outer pairs of houses project forward under a gable, and each house has a canted bay window. The central two houses have doorways and mullioned windows on the ground floor, and dormers in the roof. Most of the other windows are sashes.	II
70 and 72 Whetstone Lane, 1 and 3 Park Grove; 53.38633°N 3.02898°W		c. 1850	A group of four brick houses with concrete tiled roofs, in two storeys with attics. Six bays face Whetstone Lane, and six face Park Grove. On the Whetstone Lane front is a gabled wing with a three-light casement window in the ground floor, two mullioned and tramsomed windows with balconies in the upper floor, and two segmental windows in the attic.	II
Beechcroft; 53.38640°N 3.02744°W		c. 1850	Originally two houses, later used for other purposes, it is built in stone with Welsh slate roofs, and is in Italianate style. The building has two storeys and a symmetrical plan. On the Hollybank Road face the outer bays project forward and are gabled, and between them are bay windows and a fretted parapet. The entrances are on the sides, each with a porch and a fretted parapet. At the rear are four bays, the central two having pedimented gables, and containing cast iron balconies.	II
19 and 21 Argyll Street; 53.39480°N 3.01596°W		Mid 19th century	A pair of ashlar-faced houses, later used for other purposes, with a concrete tiled roof. They have two storeys, and the front is symmetrical, each house having three bays with a central doorway. The doorway has an architrave, and the windows are sashes.	II
23–31 Bridge Street, 3–9 Hamilton Street, 2 Albion Street; 53.39450°N 3.01348°W		Mid 19th century	A terrace of eight shops and houses with Welsh slate roofs in an L-shaped plan. They have three storeys; there are ten bays on Bridge Street, six bays on Hamilton Street, and a curved bay on the corner between them. In the ground floor are shop fronts and doorways, and above are sash windows in moulded architraves with entablatures. At the top of the building is a moulded cornice and a parapet.	II
Stork Hotel; 53.39383°N 3.01988°W		Mid 19th century	A public house, remodelled in about 1910. It has three storeys, the ground floor is in glazed brick and tiles, and the upper storeys in painted brick, and there is a Welsh slate roof. The building is on a corner site with five bays on Price Street, three bays on Adelphi Street, and a corner bay containing a blocked entrance. The ground floor windows are etched, and stained with Art Nouveau motifs, and the windows in the upper floors are sashes.	II
57 Ashville Road; 53.39334°N 3.04634°W		1854	An ashlar-faced house with a Welsh slate roof in picturesque Jacobean style. The porch has Ionic shafts and a decorated entablature. Other features include mullioned windows, Dutch gables, bay windows, and a castellated parapet with ball finials. The panelled gate piers with shallow pyramidal copings are included in the listing.	II
No. 4 Dry Dock; 53.38945°N 3.00922°W		c. 1857	The dry dock is cut out of natural red sandstone, it is reinforced by sandstone piers, and has its original wrought iron gates. The dock is 400 feet (121.9 m) long, with stepped sides. On the walls are bollards and cobbles. It is important because a number of historical ships were built in it.	II*
Wirral Christian Centre; 53.38513°N 3.03634°W		1857–59	Originally Oxton Road Congregational Church, it was designed by William Cole, and is built in stone with a Welsh slate roof. The church consists of a nave and a large tower. The tower has clasping buttresses rising to truncated pinnacles, an arched doorway with a hood mould, and an embattled parapet. In the nave are Decorated windows, and over the doorway is a rose window.	II
74 Park Road West; 53.39476°N 3.05258°W		1859	A house, later used as a nursing home, in red brick with blue brick diapering and a Welsh slate roof, and in Gothic style. It has two storeys, and consists of a three-bay left range and a right gabled wing. In the left range is an oriel window under a gable with bargeboards and a pendant finial. In the right wing is a canted bay window. All the windows are sashes with mullions and have arched heads.	II
Abbot's Grange; 53.39059°N 3.04506°W		c. 1860	Originally a house, later used as a nursing home, in red brick with white brick decoration, and a Welsh slate roof. It is in Gothic style with two storeys and has an asymmetrical plan. The entrance is to the right of centre in a gabled bay that contains a projecting, gabled porch. The windows are arched, and there is a gabled dormer to the right of the entrance bay.	II
Cannon Hill; 53.39082°N 3.04584°W		c. 1860	A terrace of houses later converted into flats, they are ashlar-faced with a tiled roof, and are in Italianate style. The terrace has three storeys, the outer bays projecting forward with pediments, and containing canted bay windows with pierced parapets. The other windows are sashes.	II
Drinking fountain 33.39384°N 3.03538°W		1860	The drinking fountain near the main entrance to Birkenhead Park is in the form of an obelisk. It is in polished granite, and stands on a pedimented plinth surrounded by steps. There is an inscription on the plinth, and the drinking bowls have been damaged.	II
Former Glass Barrel public house and 12 Market Street; 53.39185°N 3.01451°W		c. 1860	A former public house and shop remodelled from an earlier 19th-century building, it is in brick with glazed tiles in the ground floor and a Welsh slate roof. The building has three storeys, with six bays on Albion Street, four on Market Street, and an angled bay on the corner. The ground floor contains doorways and fixed windows. The windows above are sashes, those in the middle floor having shallow pediments.	II
Former Vicarage; 53.39582°N 3.03956°W		c. 1860	Originally a vicarage, later used as offices, it is in stone with a Welsh slate roof. The building has three storeys with a symmetrical three-bay front. In the centre is a projecting porch with a cast iron and stone parapet. The windows are sashes, and in the top storey are segmentally-headed dormers. The panelled gate piers with shallow pyramidal caps, the low walls, and the railings are included in the listing.	II
St Anselm's College; 53.39005°N 3.04899°W		c. 1860	Originally a house, the building is ashlar-faced with a rusticated ground floor and a Welsh slate roof in Italianate style. There are two storeys and a symmetrical three-bay entrance front. The central porch has Tuscan pilasters and a balustraded parapet. The windows are sashes.	II
Gateway, Outwood House, St Anselm's College; 53.39034°N 3.04937°W		c. 1860	The gateway has four rusticated stone piers flanking the main and side entrances. Over the side entrances are segmental arches with egg-and-dart moulding and keystones carved with heads, above which is a frieze with a green man. The gates are in wood and cast iron, and the flanking walls are rusticated with a balustered cornice.	II
Church of Our Lady of the Immaculate Conception; 53.39988°N 3.04164°W		1860–62	A Roman Catholic church by E. W. Pugin, with a chancel added in 1876–77 by Pugin and Pugin. It is in stone with Welsh slate roofs, and consists of a nave with a clerestory, aisles with confessionals, a southwest porch, an apsidal chancel with vestries, and a northeast tower that rises only to the height of the eaves. At the west end is a large rose window. The boundary wall, railings, and gate piers are included in the listing.	II
Water tower, Flaybrick Reservoir; 53.39312°N 3.06313°W		1860–65	The water tower is cylindrical, and is topped by an iron tank. The tower is in sandstone, and has two storeys. Each storey contains round-headed windows, and these are separated by Doric pilasters in the lower storey, and engaged columns above. To the south is a square chamber, also with round-headed windows.	II
2A Price Street; 53.39350°N 3.01779°W		c. 1860–70	A stone building with various functions, including in 1894–1906 the studio of Della Robbia Pottery. It has two storeys, with the ground floor rusticated, a five-bay front, and a 20th-century slate mansard roof. There are inserted openings in the ground floor, and round-arched windows above.	II
Cemetery chapels, Flaybrick Hill Cemetery; 53.39672°N 3.06547°W		1862–64	The chapels were designed by Lucy and Littler, and consisted of a symmetrical range, with chapels at the outside and central cloisters and a steeple. Each chapel has a nave, an aisle, porch, and an apsidal end; they are now roofless. The steeple had a two-stage tower with an archway, now blocked, a rose window, a clock, angle pinnacles, and a broach spire, which has been truncated.	II
Office and Lodge, Flaybrick Hill Cemetery; 53.39703°N 3.06332°W		1862–64	The office and lodge were designed by Lucy and Littler, and are in stone with a Welsh slate roof in picturesque Gothic style. They have an asymmetrical plan, and are in one and two storeys. The south front has three bays, with a central tower over the entrance porch. On the tower is a timber flèche with a wrought iron finial.	II
Main Eastern entrance, Flaybrick Hill Cemetery; 53.39685°N 3.06320°W		1862–64	The entrance was designed by Lucy and Littler. It is in stone, and has four stone gate piers flanking main and side gates. The piers are polygonal with stepped tapering caps, and between them are cast iron gates. The wall to the left incorporates a drinking fountain with a cast iron bowl and a niche with a gable. To the right the wall includes an arched doorway leading to the office.	II
Northern gate, Flaybrick Hill Cemetery; 53.40019°N 3.06616°W		1862–64	The gateway was designed by Lucy and Littler, it is in stone, and consists of two arches. The larger arch has a stepped gable, the gates are missing, and it has been partly blocked. The smaller arch to the left has a steep coped gable, and contains cast iron gates. Between the gateways is a niche containing a granite basin on a decorative corbel.	II
Cannon Mount; 53.39068°N 3.04541°W		1863	Originally a pair of houses, later divided into flats, in brick with stone dressings and a Welsh slate roof. There are two storeys and a three-bay front. The entrances are on the sides, with timber porches and a bay window above. The outer bays are gabled and contain bay windows. In the centre bay are three-light windows, and also on the front are balconies.	II
Main western gates, Flaybrick Hill Cemetery; 53.39674°N 3.06589°W		1864	The gateway was designed by Lucy and Littler, it is in stone, and consists of four stone gate piers flanking main and side gates. The piers are polygonal with stepped tapered caps and finials, and are decorated with inscribed quatrefoils. The gates are cast iron, and have twisted shafts, arrowheads, and scroll-work.	II
Secondary western gates, Flaybrick Hill Cemetery; 53.39801°N 3.06686°W		1864	The gateway was designed by Lucy and Littler, and consists of a main gate and a side gate. These are flanked by polygonal stone piers with stepped tapered caps and finials. Between them are cast iron gates with twisted shafts and arrow heads.	II
Lodge by secondary western gates, Flaybrick Hill Cemetery; 53.39812°N 3.06699°W		1864	The lodge designed by Lucy and Littler, is in stone. It has an L-shaped plan, it is in 1 1/2 storeys, and has a porch with a moulded architrave approached by steps in the angle between the ranges. In the gable adjacent to it is an oriel window, with two windows above. The other gable has paired windows and a quatrefoil.	II
Dock gateman's hut, Alfred Dock; 53.403721°N 3.022441°W		c. 1866	The dock gateman's hut at Tower Road is believed to have been constructed about 1866 at the same time as Alfred Dock, and was most probably designed by J. B. Hartley, the son of the famous dock engineer Jesse Hartley. The 150th building in Birkenhead to be listed.	II
Pillar box, Ashville Road; 53.39493°N 3.04268°W		1866–71	The pillar box was designed by John Penfold. It is in cast iron with a hexagonal plan, and it stands on a moulded base. Around it are bands, and at the top is a cornice, an ogival cap decorated with petals, and an acorn finial.	II
Transit sheds, Morpeth Dock; 53.39688°N 3.01205°W		c. 1872	A range of four sandstone sheds with a Welsh slate roof. They are in a single storey and contain wide openings. In the gabled end walls are segmental arches and circular ventilation windows. The cross walls rise above the roof line. These are the only stone transit sheds in Merseyside.	II
Crown public house 53.39218°N 3.02379°W		Late 19th century	The public house is in three storeys, it has a tiled ground floor and stuccoed brick above. There are seven bays on Conway Street, four bays on Camden Street, and an angled bay on the corner. In the ground floor are round-headed doorways and windows, between which are pilasters with embossed decoration. Above are sash windows, those in the middle floor having architraves with entablatures on brackets.	II
Statue of John Laird; 53.39374°N 3.01667°W		1877	The statue of John Laird was executed by Albert Bruce Joy. It consists of a pedestal in polished granite with a bronze figure of Laird, standing and holding plans for Birkenhead Docks. On the pedestal is an inscription.	II
50 Hamilton Street; 53.39186°N 3.01620°W		c. 1880	A brick shop with a Welsh slate roof in three storeys and a single bay. In the ground floor is a shop front, and above are three-light sash windows in moulded architraves.	II
Old HSBC Bank Building; 53.39177°N 3.01630°W		c. 1880	Built as the North and South Wales Bank, and later used for other purposes, it was designed by J. P. Seddon. The building is in sandstone with a Westmorland slate roof in Gothic style. It has two storeys and attics, with a projecting gabled bay on the left, and two bays to the right. There are two doorways, the right doorway is in a projecting porch, and the windows are divided by shafts.	II
Town Hall; 53.39318°N 3.01451°W		1883	The former town hall was designed by C. O. Ellison, it was damaged by fire in 1901 and restored by Henry Hartley. The building is in stone with a granite basement and a Welsh slate roof. On the front is a projecting portico with Corinthian columns and an entablature flanked by staircases. The building has a central tower with clock faces, and surmounted by a copper dome with a finial.	II*
Sessions Court; 53.39288°N 3.01320°W		1885–87	The court house by T. D. Barry and Sons is ashlar-faced and is in Classical style. It has a high basement and three bays, the central bay being recessed. The entrance in the basement is flanked by atlantes. In the central section above are pairs of Corinthian columns, mullioned and transomed windows, and oculi. At the top are a modillion cornice, two lantern towers, and a parapet with sculpted figures.	II
Hamilton Square station 53.39456°N 3.01391°W		1886	A railway station for the Mersey Railway by G. E. Grayson in Italianate style. It is built in brick and terracotta, and consists of a tall hydraulic tower, a pedimented booking hall, and a three-bay single-storey block to the left. The tower is in four stages with a variety of openings and, at the top, is a machicolated embattled parapet and corner pinnacles.	II
Shore Road Pumping Station; 53.39537°N 3.01256°W		c. 1886	The pumping station was designed by James Brunlees and Charles Douglas Fox to pump water from the tunnel of the Mersey Railway. It is in brick with a Welsh slate roof, and in Italianate style. The building has three storeys and six bays, and contained two grasshopper beam engines. An external stair tower was added in about 1989. The boundary walls are included in the listing.	II
Birkenhead Quaker Meeting House; 53.39008°N 3.04344°W		1892	The meeting house with integrated caretaker's house was designed by G. E. Grayson in Arts and Crafts style with vernacular features. It is built in red brick and roughcast with sandstone dressings, and has a tile roof. The meeting hall has one storey, and the caretaker's house has two, some windows are mullioned, others are mullioned and transomed, and there are dormer windows. Other features include gables, quoins, and buttresses.	II
Caffe Bien; 53.38861°N 3.03014°W		c. 1900	The former bank is in brick with stone dressings and a Westmorland slate roof in free Classical style. It has two storeys with an attic, and stands on a corner site with two bays on the left, three bays on the right, and an angled bay between. The angled bay contains the doorway, it is flanked by banded Ionic columns carrying a segmental pediment. Other features include a modillion cornice, sash windows, stone balustrades, and dormers.	II
1–7 Charing Cross; 53.38916°N 3.03087°W		1901	A range of seven shops and offices by Douglas and Minshull in Gothic style on a corner site. They are in stone and brick with roofs of Westmorland slate. The central section was originally used by the Bank of Liverpool, and is flanked by oriel windows with pyramidal roofs and a turret with a conical roof. There are four shops to the right and two to the left. Features include mullioned and transomed windows, niches with statues, dormers, a balustraded parapet, and brick diapering.	II
Queen Victoria Monument; 53.39359°N 3.01603°W		1901	The monument, designed by Edmund Kirby, stands in the centre of Hamilton Square. It is in sandstone, and in Gothic style in the form of an Eleanor cross. The monument stands on granite steps, and includes granite columns. It is octagonal, in four stages, and each stage becomes smaller as it rises. On each side is a gabled canopy, and at the top is a crocketed spire with a crown finial.	II
Wirral Education Centre; 53.39160°N 3.02141°W		1903	A former school by T. W. Cubbon in Edwardian Baroque style. It is built in red brick and orange terracotta and has a Westmorland slate roof. The building has three storeys and a front of 18 bays in seven blocks. The central block has a balcony, a Venetian window, a large segmental pediment, a Mansard roof, and a turret with an octagonal cap. The flanking blocks include turrets with statues in niches.	II
56 Hamilton Street; 53.39161°N 3.01638°W		1907	Commercial premises in three storeys and a basement, with a front of four bays. The ground floor is in rusticated stone. It contains a doorway on the right with Doric columns and a pediment, and a smaller doorway to its right. To the left are three windows with segmental heads, voussoirs, and keystones. The upper storeys are in brick with stone dressings and contain sash windows.	II
Post Office; 53.39021°N 3.01917°W		1907	The former post office, by Walter Pott, is in stone and brick, and has a Welsh slate roof. It has three storeys, with five bays on Argyll Street, two bays on Grange Street East, and an angled bay on the corner containing the entrance. Features include a rusticated ground floor, Ionic pilasters, pedimented windows, and a balustraded parapet.	II
Edward VII Memorial Clock Tower; 53.38919°N 3.02092°W		1911	The clock tower by Edmund Kirby is in Portland stone. A rusticated plinth stands on a stepped base. On the plinth is a lion on each corner, and a shaft with engaged Doric columns, a triglyph frieze, and a modillion cornice. This carries a clock flanked by volutes surmounted by a domed cap with an urn and a ball finial.	II
War Memorial; 53.39341°N 3.01524°W		1925	The war memorial consists of a cenotaph in Portland stone with carvings in Westmorland stone, designed by Lionel Budden, and sculpted by H. Tyson Smith. It has a rectangular plan and stands on three steps. The sides contain carved panels, with the names of those who died in the two World Wars, and with female figures. The top of the memorial is in the form of a sarcophagus.	II*
Entrance to Mersey Tunnel; 53.39093°N 3.01494°W		1925–34	The entrance to the Queensway Tunnel was designed by Basil Mott and John Brodie, with Herbert J. Rowse as engineer. It is built in Portland stone, and is in Egyptian style. There are two flanking lodge towers, and walls leading down to the portal. On the walls is a chevron frieze, and over the portal is a wing motif.	II
Ventilation Station, Pacific Road; 53.39730°N 3.01027°W		1925–34	The ventilation station for the Queensway Tunnel was designed by Basil Mott and John Brodie, with Herbert J. Rowse as engineer, to contain large fans. It has a steel frame faced in brick, and consists of a large tower flanked by geometric blocks. The tower is decorated with projecting bricks forming a cross on the side, and by bands of brick near its top. On the doors are chevrons.	II
Ventilation Station, Sidney Street; 53.39553°N 3.01656°W		1925–34	The ventilation station for the Queensway Tunnel was designed by Basil Mott and John Brodie, with Herbert J. Rowse as engineer, to contain large fans. It has a steel frame faced in brick, and has massive twin towers. The doors have chevron bands and architraves with wing motifs, and the towers have quoins, blind lancets and geometrical ribbed decoration.	II
Ventilation Station, Taylor Street; 53.39600°N 3.02013°W		1925–34	The ventilation station for the Queensway Tunnel was designed by Basil Mott and John Brodie, with Herbert J. Rowse as engineer, to contain large fans. It has a steel frame faced in brick, with a tower rising as a series of blocks. The doors are decorated with chevrons and scallops, their architraves have wing motifs, and the tower has a giant cross motif and a frieze of recessed panels.	II
Former Entrance to Mersey Tunnel; 53.39706°N 3.02386°W		1931–34	The entrance to the Queensway Tunnel, now closed, was designed by Basil Mott and John Brodie, with Herbert J. Rowse as engineer. It is built in Portland stone and is in Moderne style with Egyptian detailing. The entrance consists of retaining walls, with blocks at one end and the portal at the other. The decoration includes winged beasts and arrow motifs.	II
Birkenhead Central Library; 53.38609°N 3.03174°W		1933	The library is clad in Portland stone with red brick at the rear, it has a hipped roof of Norwegian slate, and the well is clad in white tiles. It is in Neoclassical style, and has a front block of two storeys with a basement. In the centre is a projecting central bay with a giant prostyle distyle Tuscan portico and an inscribed frieze. Above the doorway is a balustraded balcony with a coat of arms, and the central bay is flanked by six-bay wings. Behind the entrance is a single-story lending library.	II
Monument to the Mersey Tunnel; 53.38842°N 3.01475°W		1934	The structure had the dual purpose of commemorating the building of the Queensway Tunnel and providing lighting for it. It was designed by Herbert J. Rowse, and has been moved from its original position. It stands on a white ashlar base and consists of a shaft 60 feet (18.3 m) high carrying a lighting bowl. The shaft has a core of reinforced concrete, overlaid with black granite, and the bowl is in gilded bronze and glass. On the base of the shaft are inscriptions.	II
Telephone kiosks, Hamilton Street; 53.39262°N 3.01533°W		1935	A pair of K6 type telephone kiosk, designed by Giles Gilbert Scott. Constructed in cast iron with a square plan and a dome, they have three unperforated crowns in the top panels (one kiosk moved to Price St in 2018).	II
Telephone kiosk, Price Street; 53.39329°N 3.01760°W		1935	A K6 type telephone kiosk, designed by Giles Gilbert Scott. Constructed in cast iron with a square plan and a dome, it has three unperforated crowns in the top panels.	II

== See also ==
- Listed buildings in Bidston
- Listed buildings in Claughton, Merseyside
- Listed buildings in Noctorum
- Listed buildings in Oxton, Merseyside
- Listed buildings in Prenton
- Listed buildings in Rock Ferry
- Listed buildings in Tranmere, Merseyside
- Listed buildings in Woodchurch, Merseyside
