= Church of Christ the King, Birkenhead =

Coordinates: 53.3978°N 3.0372°W

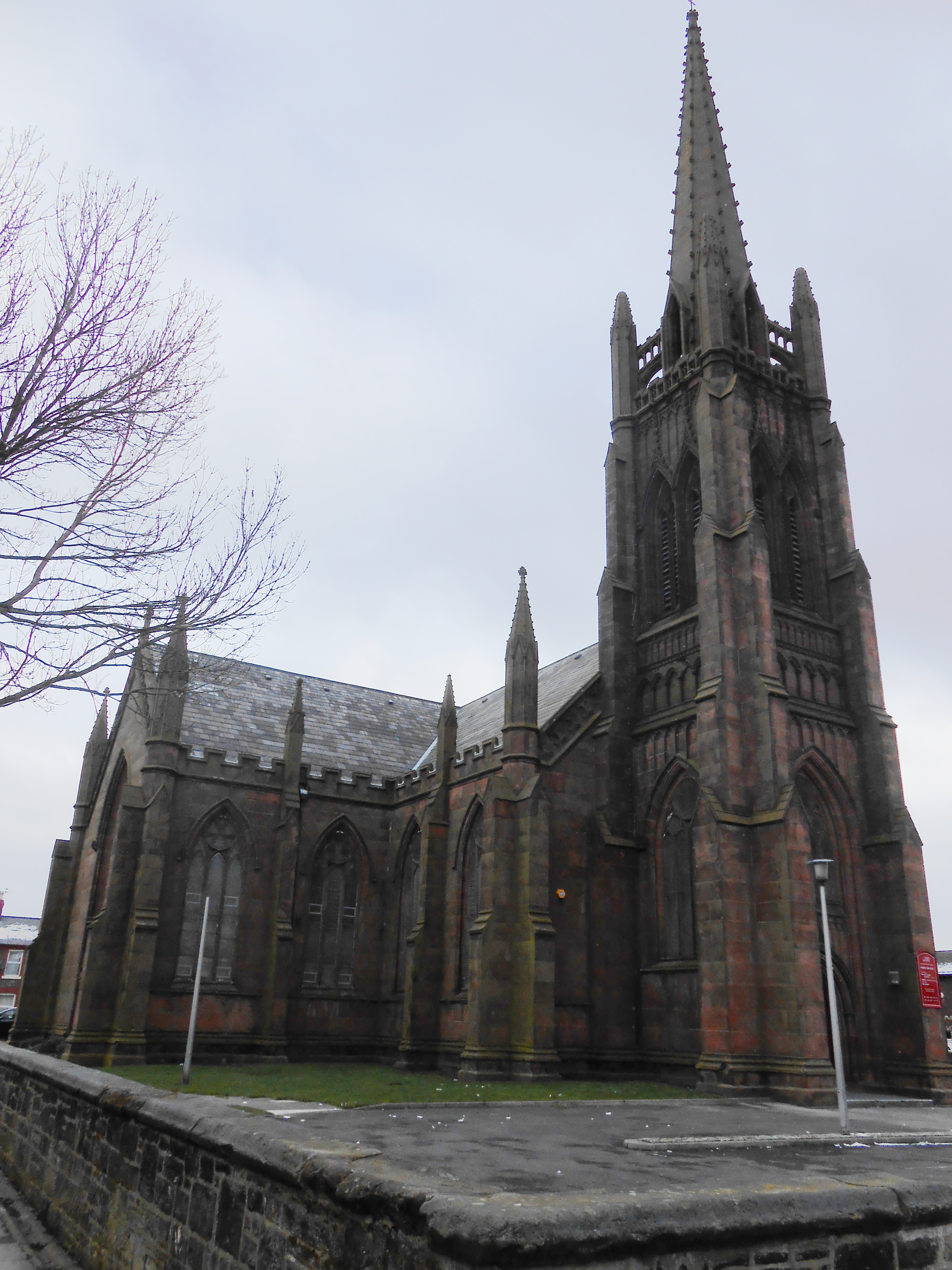
- Church of Christ the King, Birkenhead, from the northwest

- Location in Merseyside
- OS grid reference: SJ 311 895
- Location: Beckwith Street, Birkenhead, Wirral, Merseyside
- Country: England
- Denomination: Anglican
- Churchmanship: Central churchmanship
- Website: Birkenhead Priory Parish

History
- Former name(s): St Anne's Church, Birkenhead
- Status: Parish church

Architecture
- Functional status: Active
- Heritage designation: Grade II
- Designated: 21 July 1987
- Architect(s): William Cole, Charles Aldridge (chancel extension)
- Architectural type: Church
- Style: Gothic Revival
- Groundbreaking: 1846
- Completed: 1893

Specifications
- Materials: Sandstone, slate roof

Administration
- Province: York
- Diocese: Chester
- Archdeaconry: Chester
- Deanery: Birkenhead
- Parish: Birkenhead Priory

Clergy
- Vicar: Revd Paul Bentley

The Church of Christ the King is in Beckwith Street, Birkenhead, Wirral, Merseyside, England. It is an active Anglican parish church in the deanery of Birkenhead, the archdeaconry of Chester, and the diocese of Chester. It is part of the Birkenhead Priory Parish, and serves the centre of the town of Birkenhead. The other church in the parish is the chapel of Birkenhead Priory. The church is recorded in the National Heritage List for England as a designated Grade II listed building.

== History ==
The church was built between 1846 and 1850, and was designed by William Cole. In 1892–93 the chancel was more than doubled in length by Charles Aldridge. The church was originally dedicated to Saint Anne, but the dedication was changed to Christ the King in 1991 following internal alterations.

== Architecture ==
The church is constructed in red sandstone ashlar with a slate roof, and is in Decorated style. The plan consists of a two-bay nave without aisles, north and south transepts, a chancel, north and south vestries, and a west tower and spire. The tower has a west entrance with a window above it, and three tiers of blind arcading above that. The bell openings are paired, and the parapet has fretted tracery. The spire is recessed, decorated with crockets, and supported by flying buttresses. The bays of the nave and transepts are divided by gabled buttresses that rise to pinnacles, and each bay contains a three-light window. There are doorways on the north and south sides of the transepts; these are flanked by canopied niches containing statues.

Inside the church there are triple arcades between the nave and the transepts. The interior of the church has been subdivided. The two-manual pipe organ was built by Henry Willis & Sons, possibly in 1878. It was moved in 1897 from the chancel to a transept.

== See also ==
- Listed buildings in Birkenhead
