= Mary Mercer =

British politician

Mary Ann Mercer (1883 – 26 September 1945) was a British politician, who served as the first woman and first Labour Party Mayor of Birkenhead.

== Personal life ==
Born in Newport, Shropshire, her father died when she was three. Despite her limited schooling, Mercer worked as a housekeeper, trained as a nurse and then worked in Belfast as a district visitor. While there, she met and married a Labour Party activist and journalist in 1912. In 1914 they moved to the Wirral and had a family. She died in 1945 and is buried in Flaybrick cemetery, Birkenhead.

== Political life ==
Mercer became active in the Labour Party (UK) when she moved to the Wirral.

Mercer was elected to Birkenhead Town Council in 1919, representing Argyle ward. In 1924, she was elected as Mayor of Birkenhead, the first woman to hold the post, and also the first Labour Party member to hold the post. While in office, she unveiled Birkenhead War Memorial. She moved to become the town's first woman alderman in 1926, serving until 1932, when she returned to representing Argyle until 1945.

Mercer stood in Liverpool Fairfield at the 1924 United Kingdom general election, taking second place with 37.1% of the vote. She next stood in Birkenhead East at the 1935 United Kingdom general election, when she took 23.3% of the vote, and only third place.

Mercer also served as a magistrate from 1929.

== Legacy ==
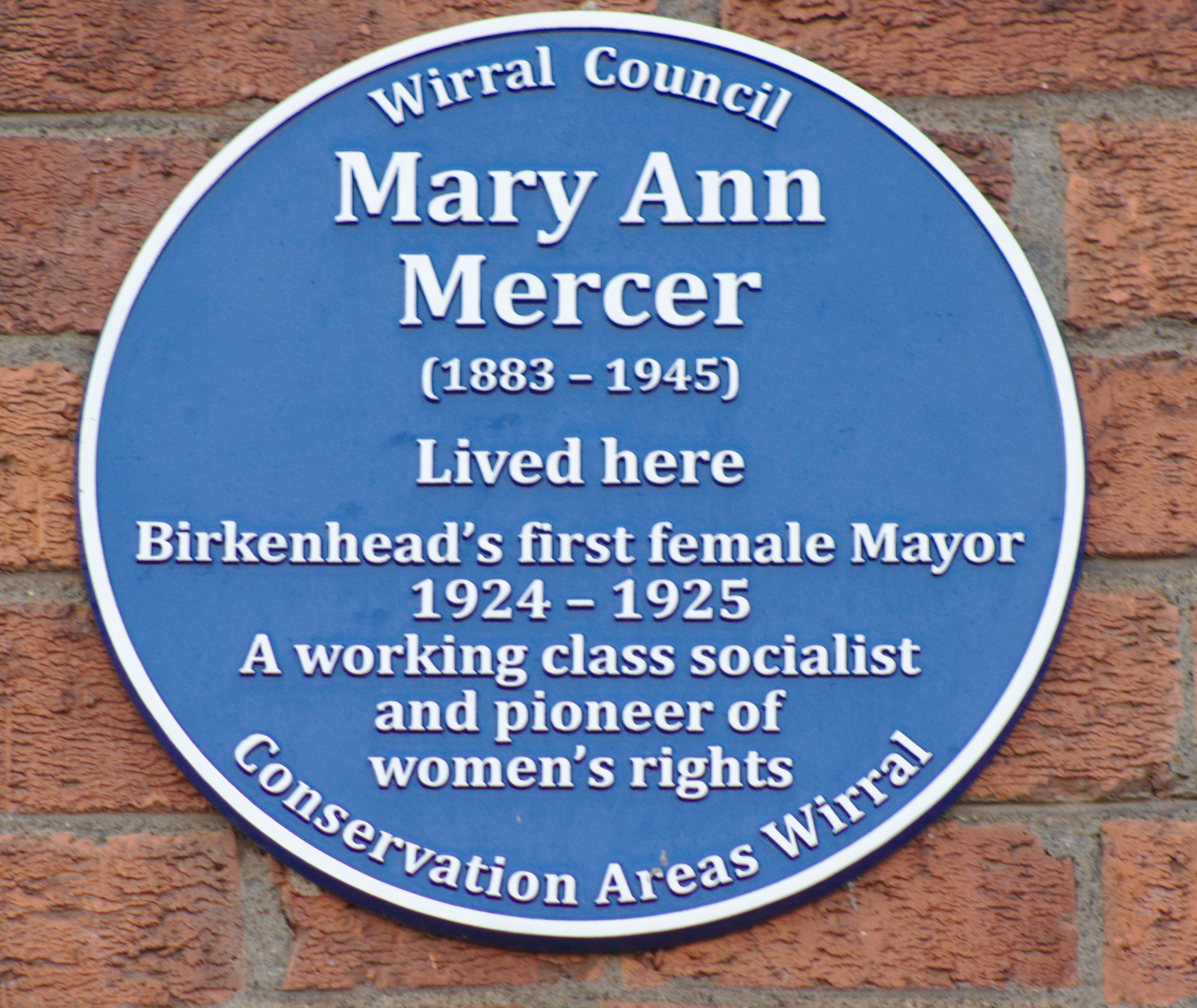
Plaque on Mercer's former home

Mercer Road in Prenton (previously the local government Bidston and St James Ward) is named after her. She was commemorated in 2018 with a blue plaque on 103 Norman Street, Birkenhead where she once lived. A portrait of her as Mayor by Maude Hall Neale is displayed in the Williamson Art Gallery, Birkenhead. In 2021 Mercer was included in a mural commissioned for the centre of Birkenhead, painted by artist Joseph Venning.

Civic offices
Preceded by Edward Henry Hoblyn	Mayor of Birkenhead; 1924–1925	Succeeded by Robert Pilling Fletcher
