= Flaybrick Memorial Gardens =

Cemetery in Birkenhead, England

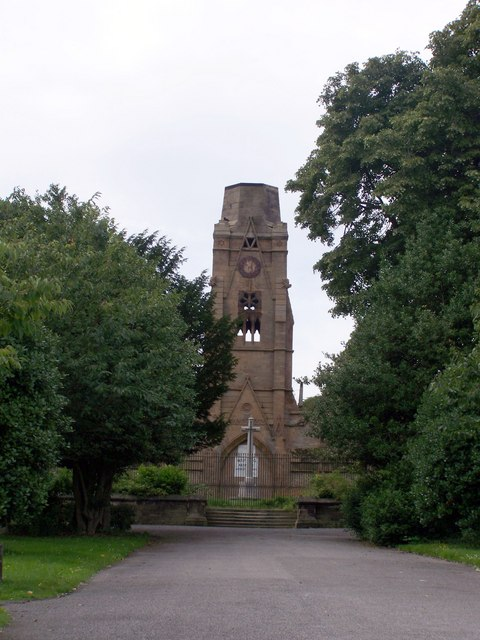
- The remains of the spire between the former Church of England and Nonconformist chapels
- Interactive map of Flaybrick Memorial Gardens

Details
- Established: 1864
- Location: Birkenhead
- Country: England
- Coordinates: 53.400°N 3.065°W
- Type: Multi-denominational, Public
- Style: Gothic Revival
- Owned by: Wirral Council
- Size: 26 acres (110,000 m^{2})
- No. of interments: Over 100,000
- Website: Flaybrick Memorial Gardens official site

Flaybrick Memorial Gardens is a memorial garden, formerly a municipal cemetery called Flaybrick Hill Cemetery, in Birkenhead, on the Wirral Peninsula, England. The cemetery has been designated a conservation area by Wirral Borough Council, which owns the site.

== History ==
In the 1840s, Joseph Paxton was approached to design a large municipal cemetery for the expanding township of Birkenhead, but because of a recession and a subsequent decrease in the population, the plan went no further. By the 1860s, a boom made the provision of a new cemetery a priority. A competition was held for the design which was won by Edward Kemp, a pupil of Paxton's and Curator of Birkenhead Park. Kemp was assisted by Edward Mills, a prominent Birkenhead surveyor from Hamilton Square, and Messrs Lucy and Littler, architects of Liverpool. The general contractor was William Rimmer of Bidston Hall, with John Middlehurst of St. Helens the contractor for buildings. The site chosen was Flaybrick Hill, a prominent location overlooked by Bidston Hill. Originally 16.5 acres (6.7 ha) were purchased, but by the 1890s the site was extended to 26 acres (11 ha).

The cemetery was officially opened 30 May 1864 and named Birkenhead Cemetery, and the site originally had three separate denominational chapels. The Roman Catholic chapel was demolished in 1971 and a memorial wall has been erected on its site. The remaining two chapels, for Nonconformists and the Church of England, were last used in 1975. Most of the buildings are now in a considerable state of dereliction. The Registrar's office and Sexton's Lodge are now privately owned.

The cemetery contains the war graves of 222 Commonwealth service personnel of both World Wars, as well as one of a Russian Navy officer of World War I. Other interments include James Taylor Cochran, who built the Resurgam; Sir William Jackson; Arthur Thomas Doodson; Mary Ann Mercer; Isaac Roberts; and Edmund Knight and Hugh Singleton, both in turn Roman Catholic Bishop of Shrewsbury.

== Conservation area ==
The cemetery was designated as a conservation area in 1990. In 1995, Flaybrick Cemetery was renamed Flaybrick Memorial Gardens and an arboretum was created. Mature specimen trees are prominent throughout the cemetery, including cut-leaf beech, silver lime, caucasian lime, London plane and monkey-puzzle. A wildlife-friendly approach to the management of the Memorial Gardens is carried out by a designated ranger.

== See also ==
- Listed buildings in Birkenhead
