= Gateway Church Wirral =

Coordinates: 53.3851°N 3.0363°W

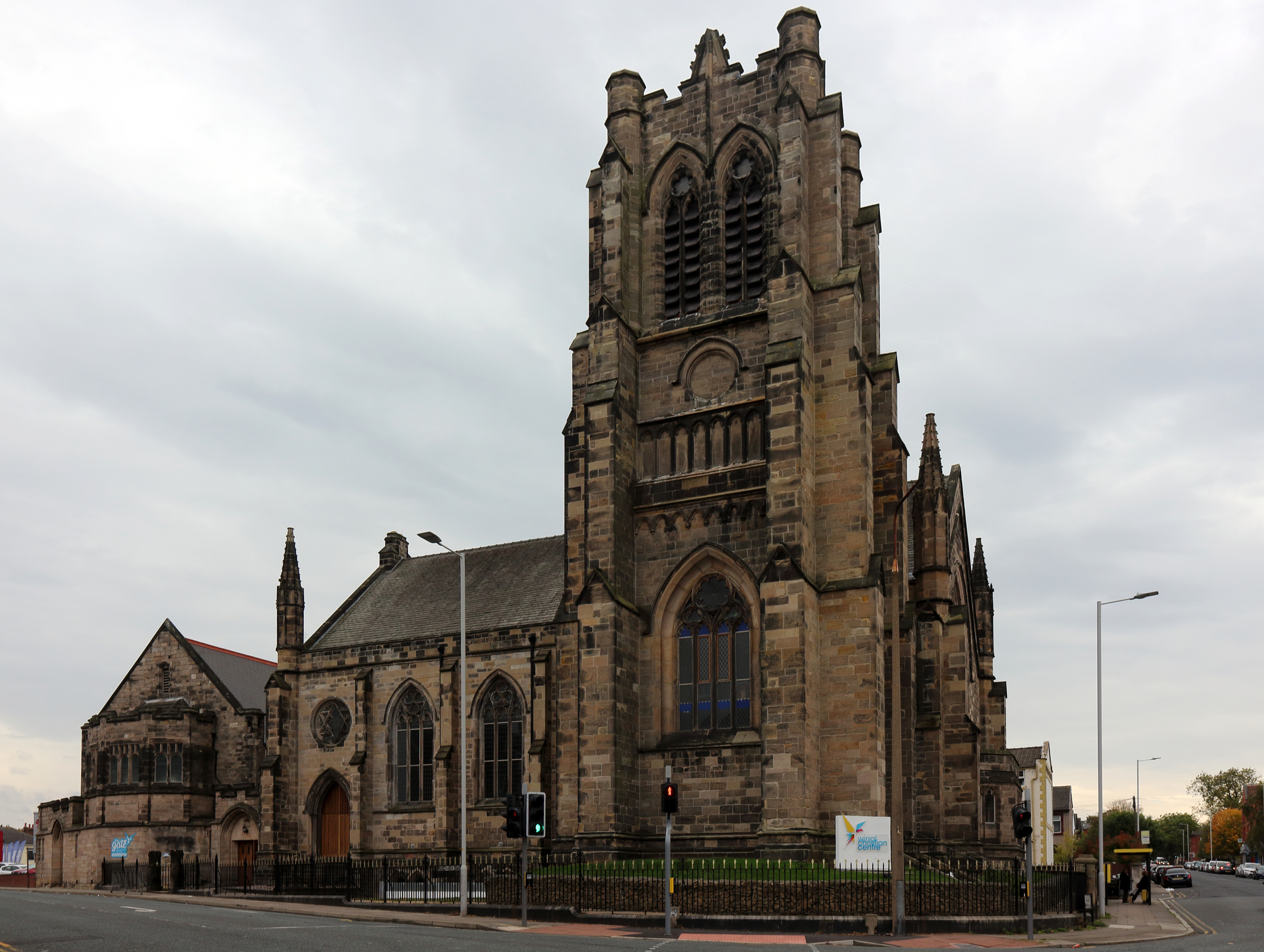
- Gateway Church Wirral

- Location in Merseyside
- OS grid reference: SJ 312 881
- Location: Woodchurch Road, Birkenhead, Wirral, Merseyside
- Country: England
- Denomination: Pentecostal

History
- Former name(s): Oxton Road Congregational Church, Wirral Christian Centre

Architecture
- Functional status: Active
- Heritage designation: Grade II
- Designated: 28 March 1974
- Architect: William Cole
- Architectural type: Church
- Style: Gothic Revival
- Groundbreaking: 1857
- Completed: 1858
- Construction cost: Over £5,000

Specifications
- Materials: Stone, slate roof

Clergy
- Pastor: Greg Epton

Gateway Church Wirral (formerly known as the Wirral Christian Centre) is a church on Woodchurch Road, Birkenhead, Wirral, Merseyside, England. It is an active Elim Pentecostal Church. The church building, originally Oxton Road Congregational Church, is recorded in the National Heritage List for England as a designated Grade II listed building. (Note: Grade II is the lowest of the three grades given to listed buildings and is applied to "buildings of national importance and special interest".)

== History ==
The building originated as a Congregational church, it was built between 1857 and 1858, and designed by William Cole. The church cost over £5,000, and a further £2,500 was spent during the 1880s on improvements. It was badly damaged by fire in 1992, and was restored, but later became redundant, and fell into disrepair. In 2008 the building was restored again to become the Wirral Christian Centre.

Its first minister was Frederick Smeeton Williams.

== Architecture ==
The church is built in rubble stone and has roofs of Westmorland slate. It consists of a wide six-bay nave with a tower on the north side. (Note: The church is orientated northwest-southeast, and the directions given in the article refer to its liturgical orientation.) At the corners of the tower are clasping buttresses. There is a west door with a moulded arch at the base of the tower, and above this is a decorative hood mould. In the top stage are paired bell openings. The summit is battlemented with corner pinnacles that have been reduced from their original height. On the other corners of the church are angle buttresses rising to form tall octagonal pinnacles. The nave has a seven-light west window, beneath which is a canted baptistry. The bays of the nave are divided by buttresses and contain three-light windows with Decorated tracery. Towards the east end of the north side is a doorway, over which is a rose window. The interior is described as a "wide short auditorium over a basement".

== See also ==
- Listed buildings in Birkenhead

== Notes and references ==
Notes

Citations
