= St James' Church, Birkenhead =

Coordinates: 53.4019°N 3.0590°W

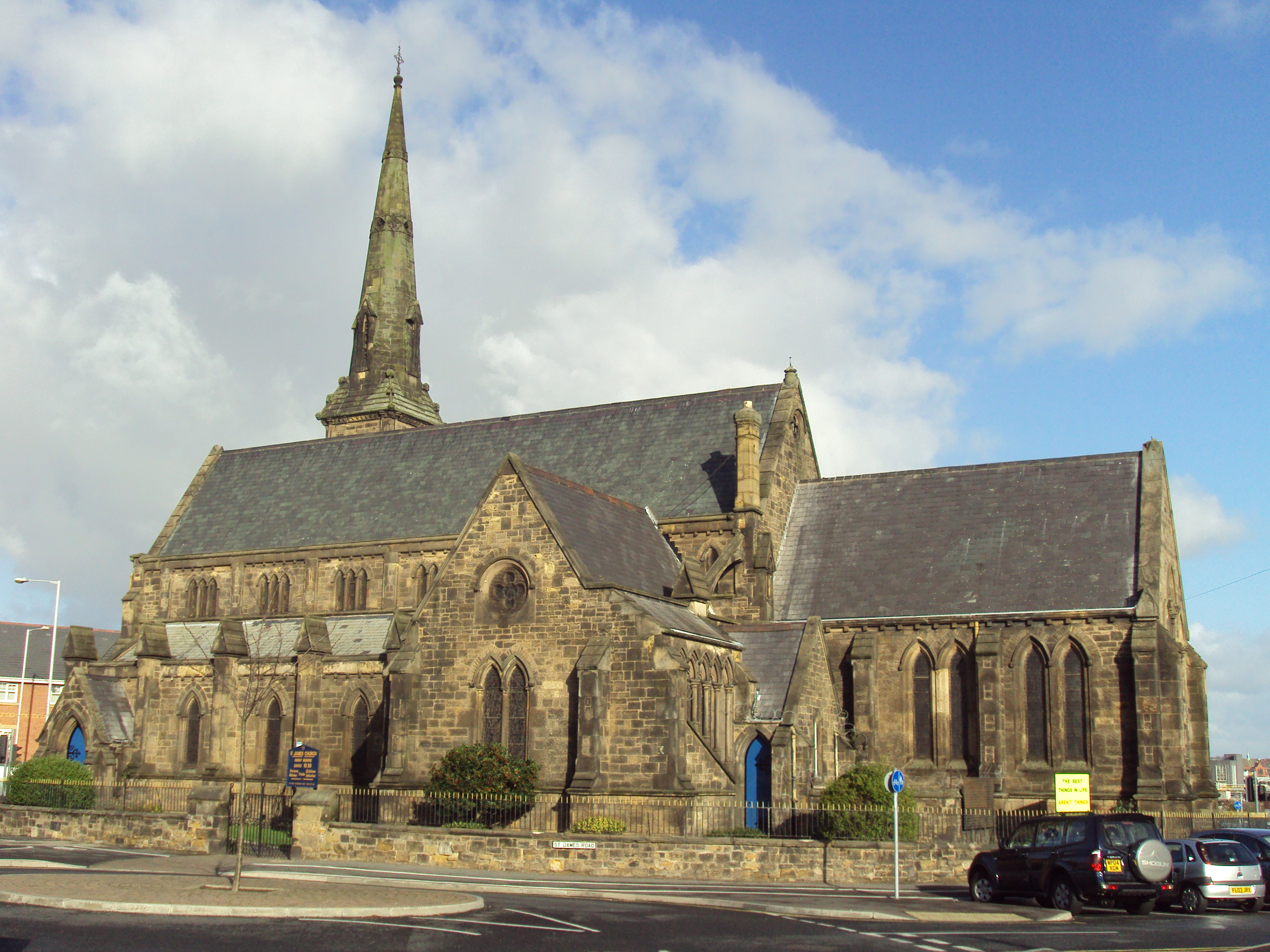
- St James' Church, Birkenhead, from the south

- Location in Merseyside
- OS grid reference: SJ 297 900
- Location: Birkenhead, Wirral, Merseyside
- Country: England
- Denomination: Anglican
- Churchmanship: Open Evangelical
- Website: St James, Birkenhead

History
- Status: Parish church

Architecture
- Functional status: Active
- Heritage designation: Grade II
- Designated: 28 March 1974
- Architect(s): C. E. Lang, Walter Scott
- Architectural type: Church
- Style: Gothic Revival
- Groundbreaking: 1845
- Completed: 1858

Specifications
- Materials: Stone, slate roof

Administration
- Province: York
- Diocese: Chester
- Archdeaconry: Chester
- Deanery: Birkenhead
- Parish: St. James with St. Bede, Birkenhead

St James' Church stands on an island site in Birkenhead, Wirral, Merseyside, England. It is an active Anglican parish church in the deanery of Birkenhead, the archdeaconry of Chester, and the diocese of Chester. Its benefice is united with that of St Bede. The church is recorded in the National Heritage List for England as a designated Grade II listed building.

== History ==
The church was designed by C. E. Lang. Building began in 1845 in what was the developing dock area of Birkenhead before there was any other substantial building nearby. For some years it remained unfinished, until it was completed in 1858 by Walter Scott.

== Architecture ==
=== Exterior ===
St James' is constructed in stone with a Welsh slate roof in Early English style. Its plan consists of a nave with a clerestory and a south porch, five-bay north and south aisles, north and south transepts, a three-bay chancel, and a northwest tower with a spire. At the west end of the church are buttresses, three lancet windows and a rose window above them. Along the walls of the aisles are gabled buttresses separating the bays; each bay contains a wide lancet window. Along the clerestory are triple lancets. In the north and south walls of the transepts are paired lancets, and a quatrefoil above. There are flying buttresses between the east ends of the transepts and the nave. Each bay of the chancel contains a pair of lancets, and there are three stepped lancets at the east end. The tower is in three stages, and has clasping buttresses. It has a north doorway with a pair of lancets above. The bell openings are in triple arches, and there are lucarnes on the spire.

=== Interior ===
Inside the church are five-bay arcades carried on cylindrical columns. The capitals are alternately ring moulded and foliated. There is an oak reredos in the chancel, and another in the south transept. The pulpit is octagonal and in stone. The font is in marble and stands on a mosaic floor. At the west end is an oak screen. The stained glass in the east window dates from 1913 and was made by Jones and Willis. It depicts Christ with Saints James and John. The three-manual pipe organ was built in 1907 by W. Rushworth and Sons.

== See also ==
- Listed buildings in Birkenhead
