= St Werburgh's Church, Birkenhead =

Coordinates: 53.3895°N 3.0218°W

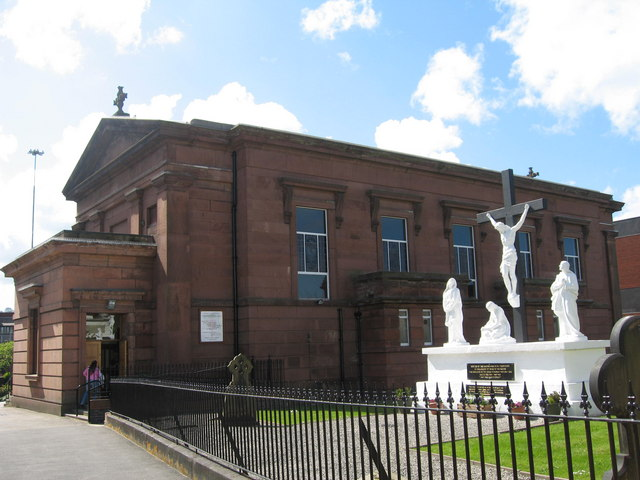
- St Werburgh's Church, Birkenhead

- Location in Merseyside
- OS grid reference: SJ 321 886
- Location: Grange Road, Birkenhead, Wirral, Merseyside
- Country: England
- Denomination: Roman Catholic
- Website: St Werburgh & St Laurence Church, Birkenhead

History
- Status: Parish church

Architecture
- Functional status: Active
- Heritage designation: Grade II
- Designated: 28 March 1974
- Architect: M. E. Hadfield (or John Smith)
- Architectural type: Church
- Style: Neoclassical
- Groundbreaking: 1835
- Completed: 1837

Specifications
- Materials: Sandstone, slate roofs

Administration
- Diocese: Shrewsbury

Clergy
- Priest: Revd Ray Burke

St Werburgh's Church is in Grange Road, Birkenhead, Wirral, Merseyside, England. It is an active Roman Catholic church in the diocese of Shrewsbury. The church is recorded in the National Heritage List for England as a designated Grade II listed building.

== History ==
The church was built between 1835 and 1837, and was opened on 15 August 1837. The Neoclassical design of the church is usually attributed to M. E. Hadfield, although an alternative suggested accreditation is to John Smith of Liverpool. St Werburgh's was the first post-reformation church built on the Wirral and the neo-classic style is believed to have been intended to give the church the character of a Greek temple in an effort to avoid provoking anti-catholic sentiment in the district. The church was damaged by bombing in 1941 when a nearby school was destroyed. In March 1995 the neighbouring church of St Laurence closed. The parish of St Laurence has been combined with that of St Werburgh to form the parish of St Werburgh and St Laurence.

== Architecture ==
St Werburgh's is constructed in pink ashlar sandstone with Welsh slate roofs. Its basement is rusticated. At the west and east ends are full-height angle pilasters, and a pediment with a cross on the apex. Protruding from the west end is a porch with a flat roof and a south doorway. On the north wall of the church are windows in flat entablatures with scrolled brackets. Protruding from the north wall are two confessionals. The nave is in five bays, and the interior of the church has been re-ordered.

== Presbytery ==
Attached to the south of the church is a presbytery. This is built in the same style and in the same materials as the church. It is in two storeys and has a double-depth plan, with a central entrance hall. The windows are replaced sashes. The presbytery is also listed at Grade II.

== See also ==
- Listed buildings in Birkenhead
