= Church of St Paul with St Luke, Tranmere =

Coordinates: 53.3741°N 3.0157°W

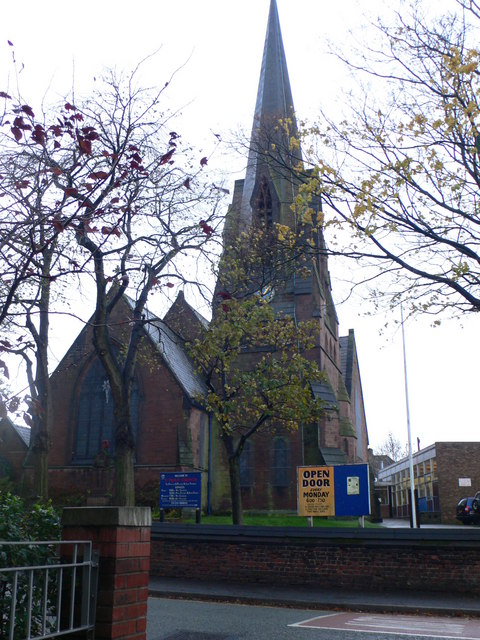
- Church of St Paul with St Luke, Tranmere

- Location in Merseyside
- OS grid reference: SJ 325 868
- Location: Old Chester Road, Tranmere, Merseyside
- Country: England
- Denomination: Anglican
- Churchmanship: Moderate Catholic
- Website: www.achurchnearyou.com/tranmere-stpaul

History
- Former name(s): St Paul's Church, Tranmere
- Status: Parish church
- Dedication: Saint Paul and Saint Luke

Architecture
- Functional status: Active
- Heritage designation: Grade II
- Designated: 28 March 1974
- Architect(s): W. and J. Hay
- Architectural type: Church
- Style: Gothic Revival
- Groundbreaking: 1854
- Completed: 1855

Specifications
- Materials: Sandstone, slate roofs

Administration
- Province: York
- Diocese: Chester
- Archdeaconry: Chester
- Deanery: Birkenhead
- Parish: St Paul with St Luke, Tranmere

Clergy
- Vicar: In vacancy

The Church of St Paul with St Luke is in Old Chester Road, Tranmere, Merseyside, England. It is an active Anglican parish church in the deanery of Birkenhead, the archdeaconry of Chester, and the diocese of Chester. The church is recorded in the National Heritage List for England as a designated Grade II listed building.

== History ==
The church was built in 1854–55, and designed by W. and J. Hay. The parish was initially dedicated only to Saint Paul. In 1971 the adjacent church of Saint Luke, Lower Tranmere closed, and the benefices were united.

== Architecture ==
=== Exterior ===
The church is constructed in red sandstone with Welsh slate roofs. Its plan consists of a three-bay nave without aisles, north and south transepts, a chancel with a south vestry, and a large tower with a spire to the north of the chancel. The tower has angle buttresses, one of them containing a stair turret. It has a north door and windows with trefoil heads. Towards the top of the tower are windows within arcading. On the angles of the tower are pinnacles, and it is surmounted by a broach spire containing lucarnes. The larger windows in the body of the church contain Decorated tracery. Along the sides of the nave are three two-light windows, and the west and east windows have five lights. On the sides of each transept are five lancet windows, with a four-light window above.

=== Interior ===
Inside the church is a rood screen designed by Hastwell Grayson. This was created in 1910 and enriched in 1922. It contains traceried openwork panels in Perpendicular style, and a central enriched arch. Above it in a canopy is a crucifix and the figures of Saint Mary and Saint John. The pulpit dates from 1922 and is in a similar style to the rood screen. The painted reredos is elaborate, consisting of a centrepiece created between 1883 and 1897 depicting Christ in Majesty, and with wings added after 1907 with angels and saints. The marble font is octagonal, and carved with angels on low relief. There is stained glass in the windows of the chancel and the transepts. The two-manual pipe organ is in the west wall of the north transept. It was made by Rushworth and Dreaper, and later rebuilt by John Cowin. This organ replaced an early one made by Forster and Andrews.

== See also ==
- Listed buildings in Tranmere, Merseyside
