= Birkenhead Priory =

Heritage site in Wirral, England

Coordinates: 53°23′22″N 3°0′41″W

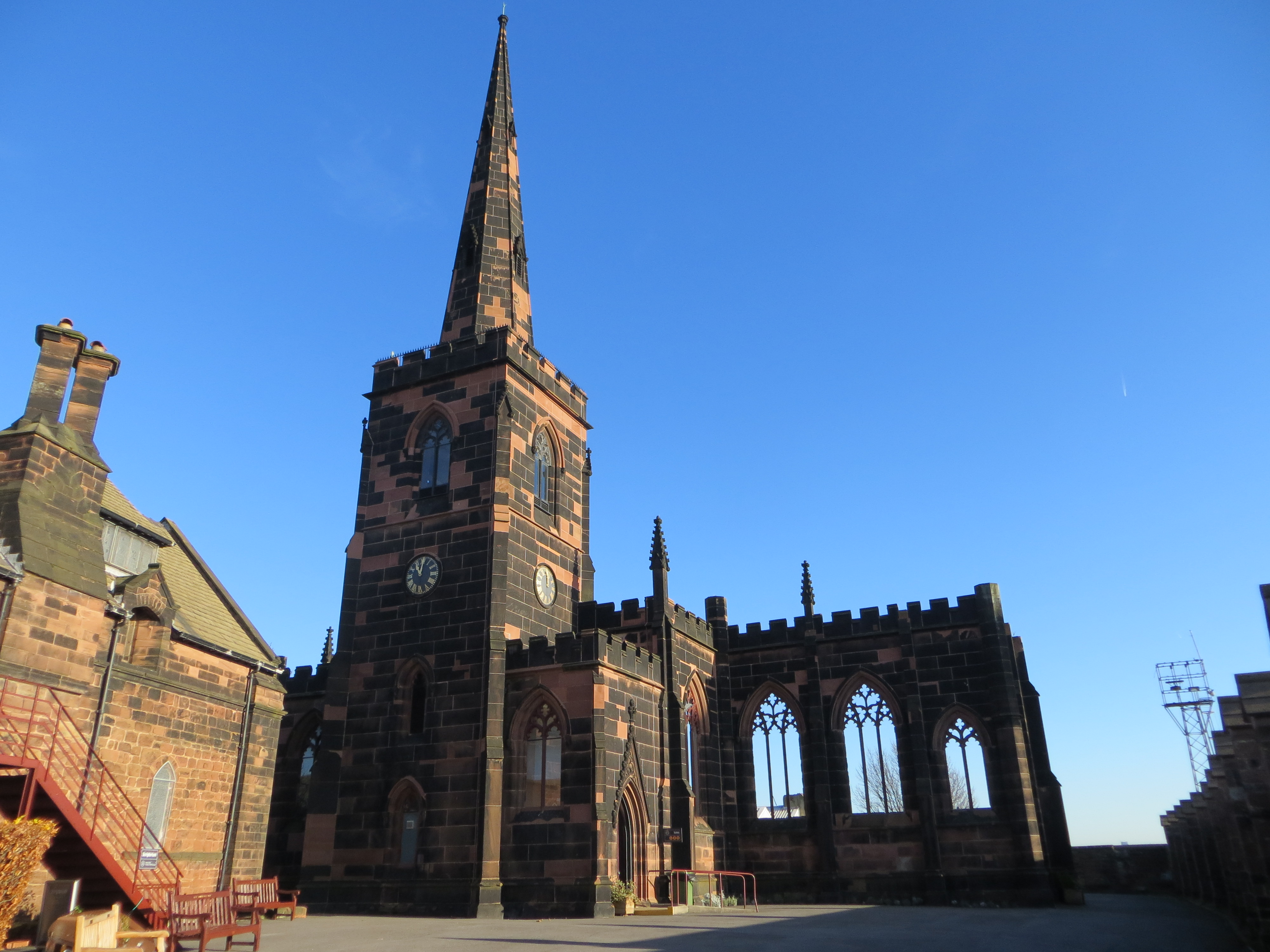
St Mary's Tower on the grounds of Birkenhead Priory.

Birkenhead Priory is in Priory Street, Birkenhead, Merseyside, England. It is the oldest standing building on Merseyside. The site comprises the medieval remains of the priory itself, the priory chapter house, and the remains of St Mary's Church. All three are recorded in the National Heritage List for England, though at different grades.

== History ==
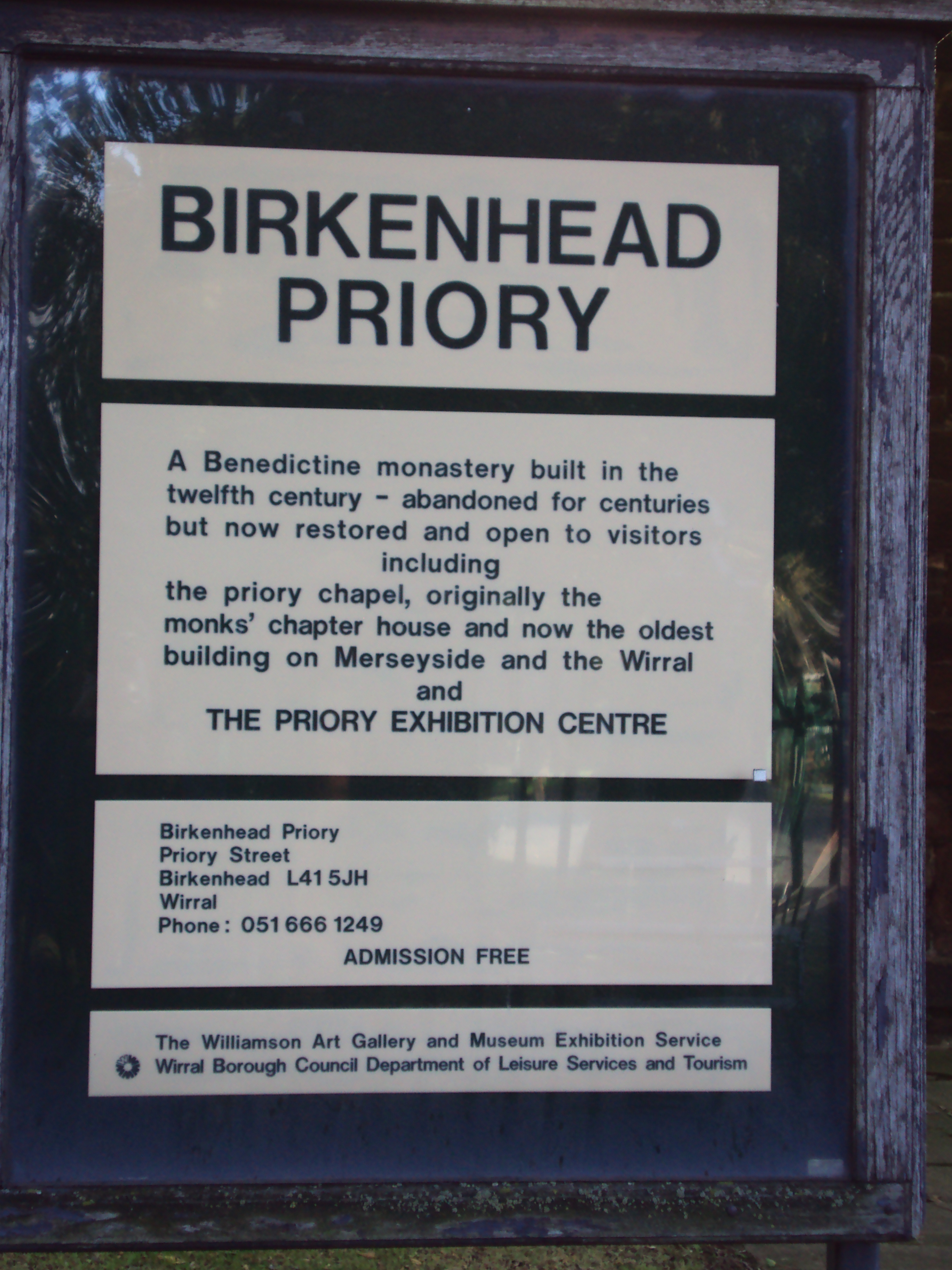
Birkenhead Priory Visitors Sign

The Priory was founded about 1150 by Hamon de Masci, 3rd Baron of Dunham Massey for the Benedictine Order. It was visited twice by Edward I due to its strategic importance, being close to the Irish Sea as well as the Welsh border.

In 1318 the monks from Birkenhead Priory were granted ferry rights by Edward II. This allowed them to build a house in what is now Water Street to store their corn. The house was also used by travellers for shelter if the weather was too bad for the ferry to cross the River Mersey.

The medieval remains of the priory are designated Grade I listed building, and it is a Scheduled Ancient Monument.

The priory's chapter house dates from the late 12th century, though it was extensively restored in the early 20th century. It was in use as a chapel from the Reformation and remains a consecrated Anglican church which is still in use for services. It is a Grade II* listed building containing elements of Norman architecture and was restored in 2005. The upper floor of the chapter house, the Scriptorium, contains a chapel dedicated to the training ship HMS Conway.

St Mary's Tower was originally part of Birkenhead's first parish church, opened in 1821 in the grounds of the priory. It is a Grade II listed building.

The ground floor of the Frater House contains a museum detailing the history of the site.

== Twentieth century ==
Redevelopment of the area from 1925 resulted in a large amount of residential housing within the parish being cleared to make way for the construction of the Queensway Tunnel. An expansion of the Number 5 dry dock at the adjacent Cammell Laird shipyard in the 1960s resulted in the church losing a significant portion of its graveyard. Subsequent redevelopment of the approach roads to the Mersey Tunnel effectively cut off the church from most of what remained of its parish, further dwindling the congregation. St. Mary's Church closed in 1974 and was partly demolished a year later, for reasons of safety. Only the former church tower and parts of the outer walls remain. The tower has since been refurbished and is dedicated to those who died in HMS Thetis.

The churchyard contains the burial vault of the Laird family, which includes John Laird (1805–74), Birkenhead's first Member of Parliament and co-founder of the adjacent Cammell Laird shipbuilding company.

== Arms ==
Coat of arms of Birkenhead Priory
Escutcheon Quarterly Gules and Or over all a crosier erect Proper in the first quarter a lion of England.

== See also ==
- Grade I listed buildings in Merseyside
- Listed buildings in Birkenhead
